= Vayikra (parashah) =

Torah portion

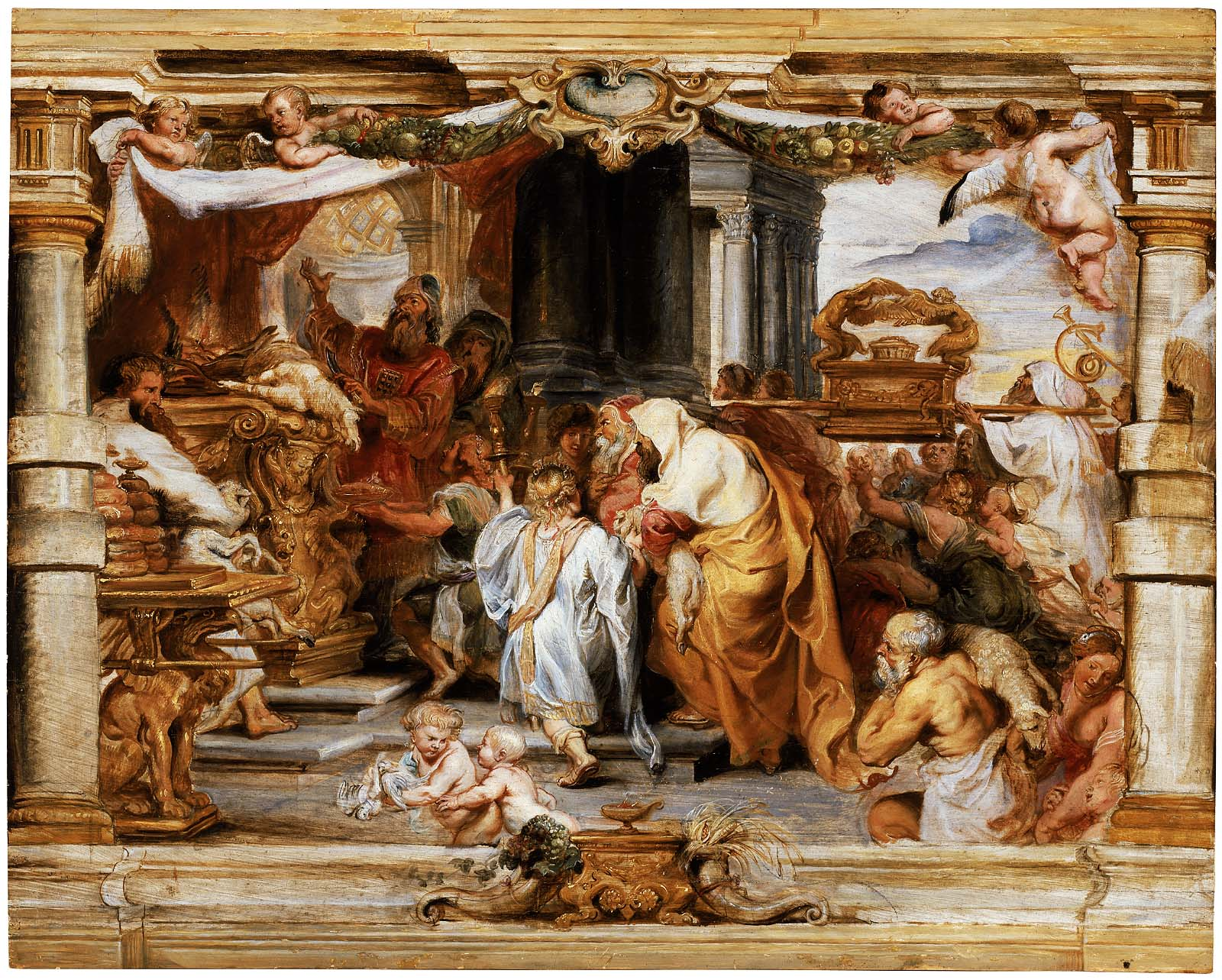
The Sacrifice of the Old Covenant (painting by Peter Paul Rubens)

Parashat Vayikra, VaYikra, Va-yikra, Wayyiqra, or Wayyiqro (וַיִּקְרָא—Hebrew for "and He called," the first word in the parashah) is the 24th weekly Torah portion (פָּרָשָׁה, parashah) in the annual Jewish cycle of Torah reading and the first in the Book of Leviticus. The parashah lays out the laws of sacrifices (קָרְבָּנוֹת, korbanot). It constitutes Leviticus 1:1–5:26.

The parashah has the most letters and words of any of the weekly Torah portions in the Book of Leviticus (although not the most verses). It is made up of 6,222 Hebrew letters, 1,673 Hebrew words, 111 verses, and 215 lines in a Torah scroll (סֵפֶר תּוֹרָה, Sefer Torah). (Parashat Emor has the most verses of any Torah portion in Leviticus.) Jews read it the 23rd or 24th Sabbath after Simchat Torah, generally in March or early April.

== Readings ==
In traditional Sabbath Torah reading, the parashah is divided into seven readings, or עליות, aliyot.

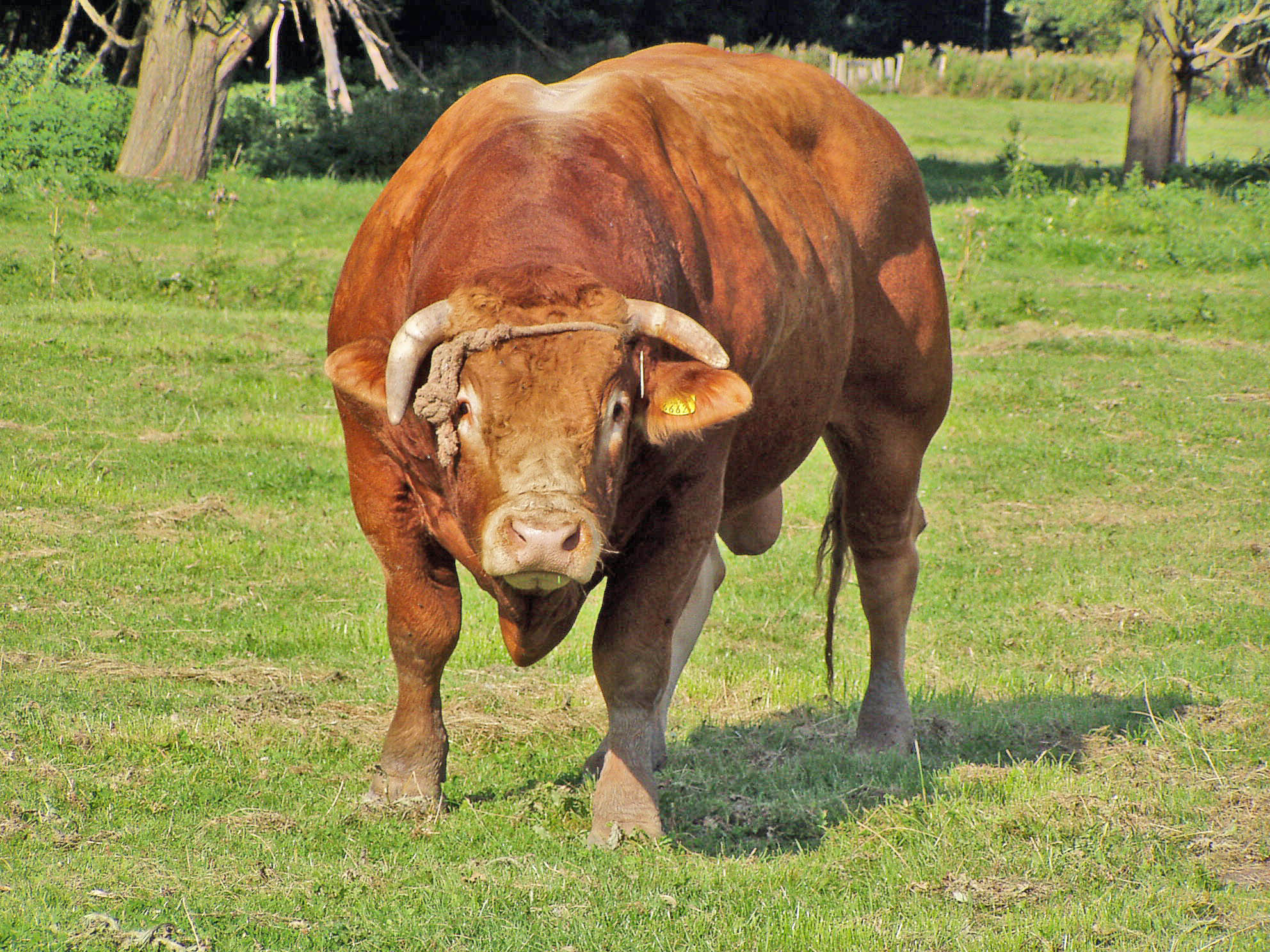

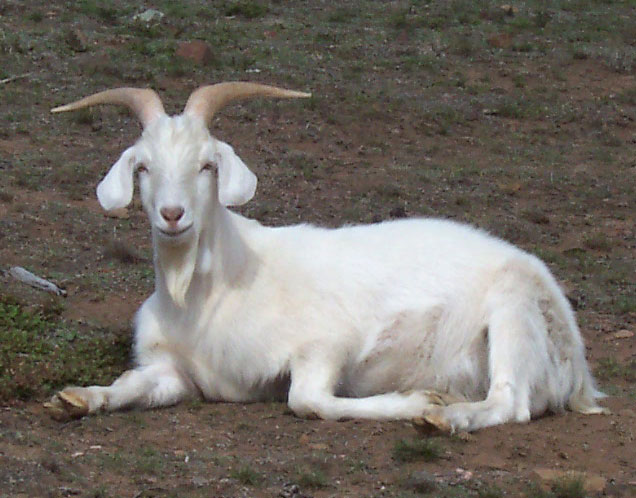

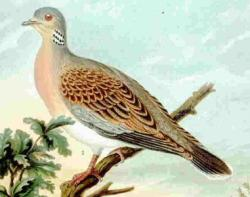

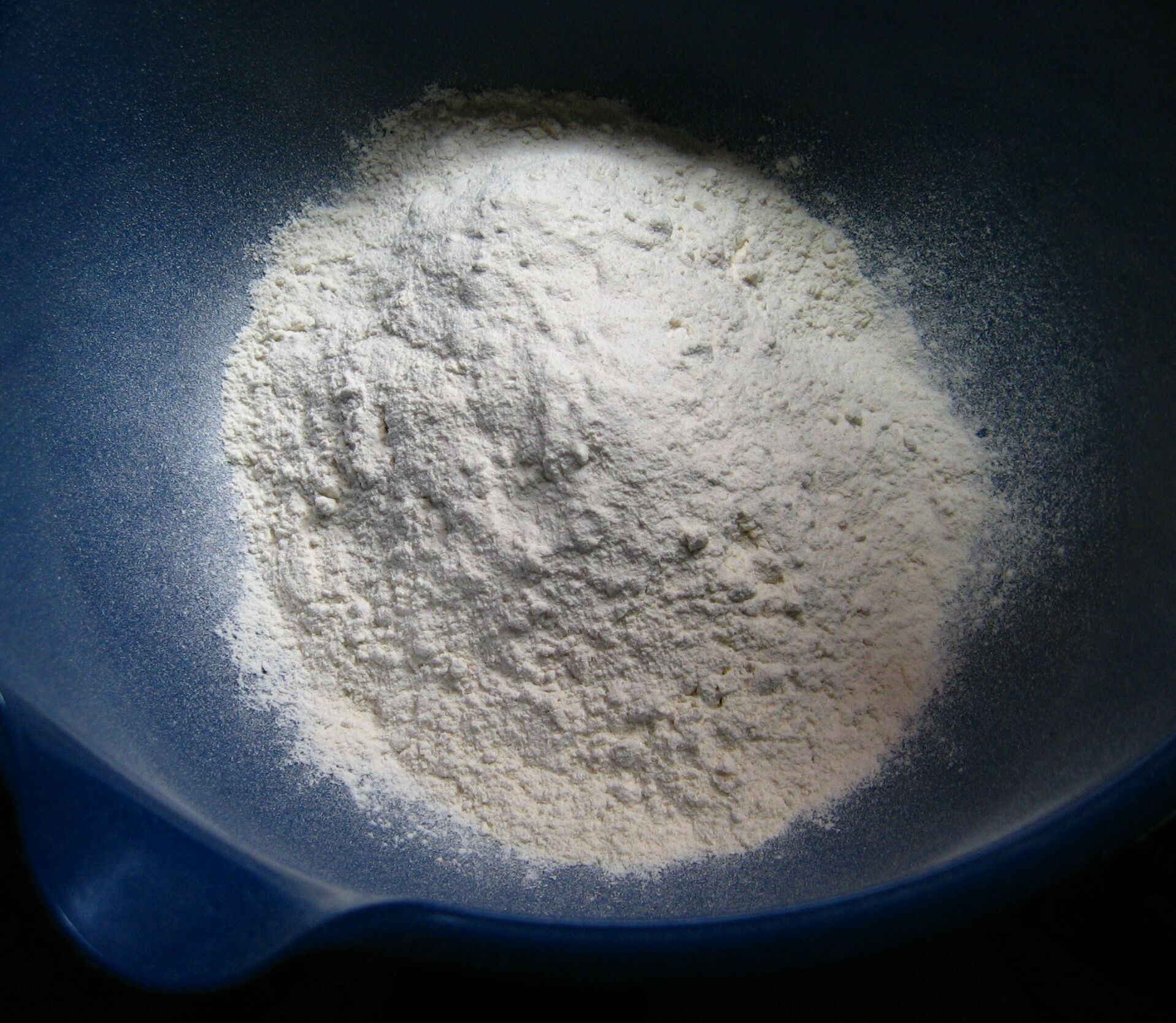

=== First reading—Leviticus 1:1–13 ===
In the first reading, God called to Moses from the Tabernacle and told him the laws of the sacrifices. Burnt offerings (עֹלָה, olah) could be bulls, rams, or male goats, or turtledoves or pigeons, which the Kohen priests burned completely on wood on the temple altar.

=== Second reading—Leviticus 1:14–2:6 ===
In the second reading, burnt offerings could also be turtle doves or pigeons, which the priest also burned completely on wood on the altar.

Meal offerings (מִנְחָה, minchah) were of choice flour with oil, from which priest would remove a token portion to burn on the altar, and the remainder the priests could eat.

=== Third reading—Leviticus 2:7–16 ===
In the third reading, meal offerings could also be cooked in a pan. Meal offerings could not contain leaven or honey, and had to be seasoned with salt. Meal offerings of first fruits had to be new ears parched with fire, grits of the fresh grain.

=== Fourth reading—Leviticus 3:1–17 ===
In the fourth reading, sacrifices of well-being (שְׁלָמִים, shelamim) could be male or female cattle, sheep, or goats, from which the priest would dash the blood on the sides of the altar and burn the fat around the entrails, the kidneys, and the protuberance on the liver on the altar.

=== Fifth reading—Leviticus 4:1–26 ===
In the fifth reading, sin offerings (חַטָּאת, chatat) for unwitting sin by the High Priest or the community required sacrificing a bull, sprinkling its blood in the Tent of Meeting, burning on the altar the fat around the entrails, the kidneys, and the protuberance on the liver, and burning the rest of the bull on an ash heap outside the camp. Guilt offerings for unwitting sin by a chieftain required sacrificing a male goat, putting some of its blood on the horns of the altar, and burning its fat.

=== Sixth reading—Leviticus 4:27–5:10 ===
In the sixth reading, guilt offerings for unwitting sin by a lay person required sacrificing a female goat, putting some of its blood on the horns of the altar, and burning its fat. Sin offerings were required for cases when a person:

- was able to testify but did not give information,
- touched any unclean thing,
- touched human uncleanness, or
- uttered an oath and forgot.

In such cases, the person had to confess and sacrifice a female sheep or goat, or if the person could not afford a sheep, two turtledoves or two pigeons.

=== Seventh reading—Leviticus 5:11–26 ===
In the seventh reading, if a person could not afford two turtledoves or pigeons, then the person was to bring flour for a sin offering to the priest, and the priest would take a handful of it and make it smoke on the altar and thereby make atonement.

Guilt offerings (אָשָׁם, asham) were required when a person was unwittingly remiss about any sacred thing. In such cases, the person had to sacrifice a ram and make restitution plus 20 percent to the priest. Similarly, guilt offerings were required when a person dealt deceitfully in the matter of a deposit or a pledge, through robbery, by fraud, or by finding something lost and lying about it. In such cases, the person had to sacrifice a ram and make restitution plus 20 percent to the victim.

=== Readings according to the triennial cycle ===
Jews who read the Torah according to the triennial cycle of Torah reading read the parashah according to the following schedule:

	Year 1	Year 2	Year 3
	2023, 2026, 2029 ...	2024, 2027, 2030 ...	2025, 2028, 2031 ...
Reading	1:1–2:16	3:1–4:26	4:27–5:26
1	1:1–4	3:1–5	4:27–31
2	1:5–9	3:6–11	4:32–35
3	1:10–13	3:12–17	5:1–10
4	1:14–17	4:1–7	5:11–13
5	2:1–6	4:8–12	5:14–16
6	2:7–13	4:13–21	5:17–19
7	2:14–16	4:22–26	5:20–26
Maftir	2:14–16	4:24–26	5:24–26

== In inner-Biblical interpretation ==
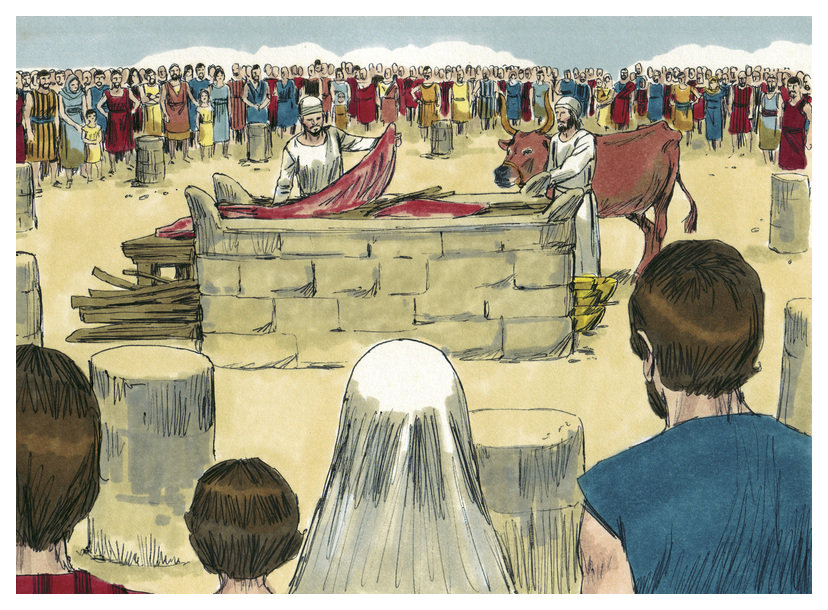
Priests Offering a Sacrifice (1984 illustration by Jim Padgett)

The parashah has parallels or is discussed in these Biblical sources:

=== Leviticus chapter 1–7 ===
In Psalm 50, God clarifies the purpose of sacrifices. God states that correct sacrifice was not the taking of a bull out of the sacrificer's house, nor the taking of a goat out of the sacrificer's fold, to convey to God, for every animal was already God's possession. The sacrificer was not to think of the sacrifice as food for God, for God neither hungers nor eats. Rather, the worshiper was to offer God the sacrifice of thanksgiving and call upon God in times of trouble, and thus God would deliver the worshiper, and the worshiper would honor God.

Psalm 107 enumerates four occasions on which a thank offering (זִבְחֵי תוֹדָה, zivchei todah), as described in Leviticus 7:12–15 (referring to a זֶבַח תּוֹדַת, zevach todah) would be appropriate: (1) passage through the desert, (2) release from prison, (3) recovery from serious disease, and (4) surviving a storm at sea.

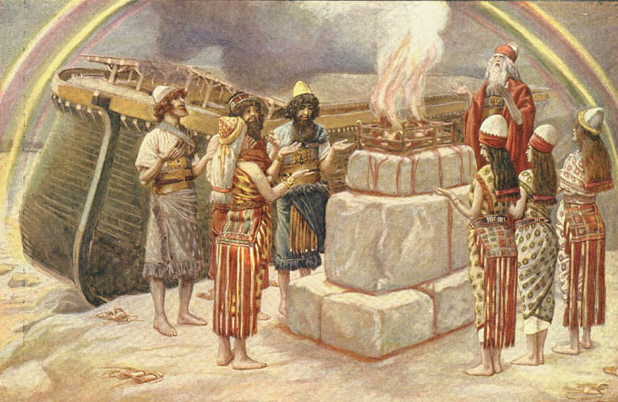
Noah's Sacrifice (watercolor circa 1896–1902 by James Tissot)

The Hebrew Bible reports several instances of sacrifices before God explicitly called for them in Leviticus 1–7. While Leviticus 1:3–17 and Leviticus 6:1–6 set out the procedure for the burnt offering (עֹלָה, olah), before then, Genesis 8:20 reports that Noah offered burnt offerings (עֹלֹת, olot) of every clean beast and bird on an altar after the waters of the Flood subsided. The story of the Binding of Isaac includes three references to the burnt offering (עֹלָה, olah). In Genesis 22:2, God told Abraham to take Isaac and offer him as a burnt offering (עֹלָה, olah). Genesis 22:3 then reports that Abraham rose early in the morning and split the wood for the burnt offering (עֹלָה, olah). And after the angel of the Lord averted Isaac's sacrifice, Genesis 22:13 reports that Abraham lifted up his eyes and saw a ram caught in a thicket, and Abraham then offered the ram as a burnt offering (עֹלָה, olah) instead of his son. Exodus 10:25 reports that Moses pressed Pharaoh for Pharaoh to give the Israelites "sacrifices and burnt offerings" (זְבָחִים וְעֹלֹת, zevachim v'olot) to offer to God. And Exodus 18:12 reports that after Jethro heard all that God did to Pharaoh and the Egyptians, Jethro offered a burnt offering and sacrifices (עֹלָה וּזְבָחִים, olah uzevachim) to God.

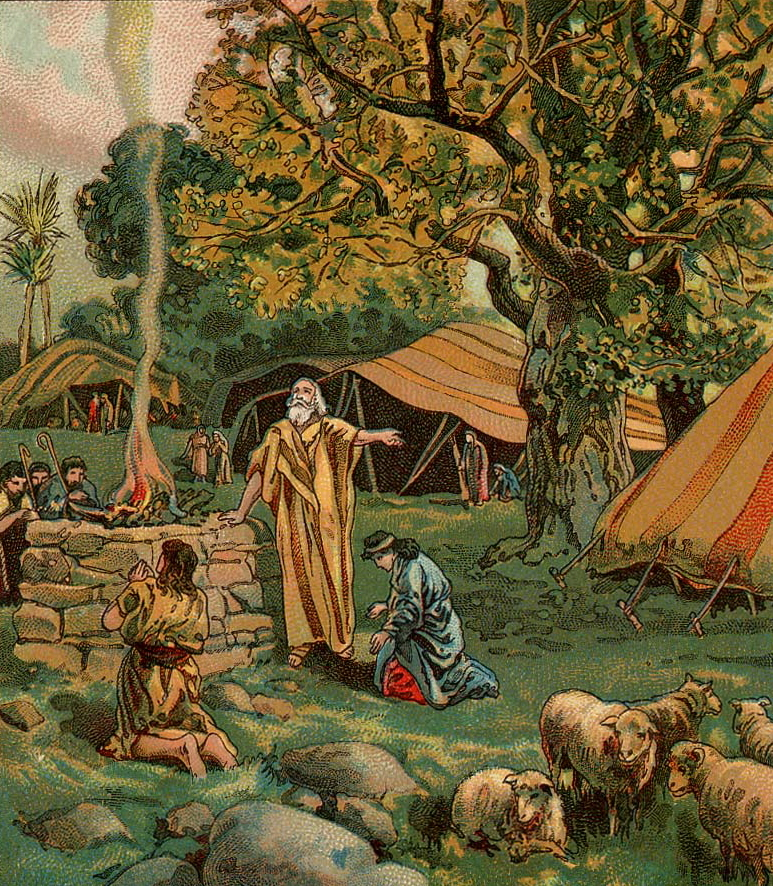
Abram Called To Be a Blessing (illustration from a Bible card published 1906 by the Providence Lithograph Company)

While Leviticus 2 and 6:7–16 set out the procedure for the meal offering (מִנְחָה, minchah), before then, in Genesis 4:3, Cain brought an offering (מִנְחָה, minchah) of the fruit of the ground. And then Genesis 4:4–5 reports that God had respect for Abel and his offering (מִנְחָתוֹ, minchato), but for Cain and his offering (מִנְחָתוֹ, minchato), God had no respect.

And while Numbers 15:4–9 indicates that one bringing an animal sacrifice needed also to bring a drink offering (נֶּסֶךְ, nesech), before then, in Genesis 35:14, Jacob poured out a drink offering (נֶּסֶךְ, nesech) at Bethel.

More generally, the Hebrew Bible addressed "sacrifices" (זְבָחִים, zevachim) generically in connection with Jacob and Moses. After Jacob and Laban reconciled, Genesis 31:54 reports that Jacob offered a sacrifice (זֶבַח, zevach) on the mountain and shared a meal with his relatives. And after Jacob learned that Joseph was still alive in Egypt, Genesis 46:1 reports that Jacob journeyed to Beersheba and offered sacrifices (זְבָחִים, zevachim) to the God of his father, Isaac. And Moses and Aaron argued repeatedly with Pharaoh over their request to go three days' journey into the wilderness and sacrifice (וְנִזְבְּחָה, venizbechah) to God.

The Hebrew Bible also includes several ambiguous reports in which Abraham or Isaac built or returned to an altar and "called upon the name of the Lord." In these cases, the text implies but does not explicitly state that the Patriarch offered a sacrifice. And at God's request, Abraham conducted an unusual sacrifice at the Covenant between the Pieces (ברית בין הבתרים) in Genesis 15:9–21.

=== Leviticus chapter 5 ===
The Rabbis read Leviticus 5:21–26 and Numbers 5:6–8 as related passages. Leviticus 5:21–26 deals with those who sin and commit a trespass against God by dealing falsely with their neighbors in the matter of a deposit, pledge, robbery, other oppression of their neighbors, or the finding of lost property, and swear to a lie. Leviticus 5:23–24 provides that the offender must immediately restore in full to the victim the property at issue and shall add an additional fifth part. Leviticus 5:25–26 requires the offender to bring to the priest an unblemished ram for a guilt offering, and the priest shall make atonement for the offender before God, and the offender shall be forgiven. Numbers 5:6–7 directs that when people commit any sin against God, then they shall confess and make restitution in full to the victim and add a fifth part. And Numbers 5:8 provides that if the victim has no heir to whom restitution may be made, the offender must make restitution to the priest and the ram of atonement.

== In classical rabbinic interpretation ==
The parashah is discussed in the Rabbinic literature from the era of the Mishnah through the Talmud:

=== Leviticus chapter 1 ===
Leviticus Rabbah reports that Rav Assi said that young children began their Torah studies with Leviticus and not with Genesis because young children are pure. The sacrifices explained in Leviticus are pure, so the pure studied the pure.

A midrash noted that the section recounting the setting up of the Tabernacle in Exodus 38:21–40:38, in which, beginning with Exodus 39:1, nearly every paragraph concludes, "Even as the Lord commanded Moses," is followed by Leviticus 1:1: "And the Lord called to Moses." The Midrash compared this to the case of a king who commanded his servant to build him a palace. On everything the servant built, he wrote the name of the king. The servant wrote the king's name on the walls, the pillars, and the roof beams. After some time, the king entered the palace, and on everything he saw, he found his name. The king thought the servant had done him all this honor, yet the servant remained outside. So the king had called that the servant might come right in. So, when God directed Moses to make God a Tabernacle, Moses wrote on everything he made, "Even as the Lord commanded Moses." God thought Moses had done God all this honor, yet Moses remained outside. So God called Moses so that he might enter the innermost part of the Tabernacle. Therefore, Leviticus 1:1 reports, "And the Lord called to Moses." Rabbi Samuel bar Nahman said in the name of Rabbi Nathan that "as the Lord commanded" is written 18 times in the section recounting the setting up of the Tabernacle in Parashat Pekudei, corresponding to the 18 vertebrae of the spinal column. Likewise, the Sages instituted 18 benedictions of the Amidah prayer, corresponding to the 18 mentions of the Divine Name in the reading of the Shema, and also in Psalm 29. Rabbi Hiyya bar Abba taught that the 18 times "command" is counted only from Exodus 38:23, "And with him was Oholiab, the son of Ahisamach of the tribe of Dan," until the end of the Book of Exodus.

Tractate Zevachim in the Mishnah, Tosefta, and Babylonian Talmud interpreted the law of animal sacrifices in Leviticus 1–5. The Mishnah taught that a sacrifice was slaughtered for the sake of six things: (1) for the sake of the sacrifice for which it was consecrated, (2) for the sake of the offerer, (3) for the sake of the Divine Name, (4) for the sake of the altar fires, (5) for the sake of an aroma, and (6) for the sake of pleasing God, and a sin offering and a guilt offering for the sake of sin. Rabbi Jose taught that even if the offerer did not have any of these purposes at heart, the offering was valid because it was a court regulation since the intention was determined only by the priest who performed the service.

A Midrash taught that if people repent, it is accounted as if they had gone up to Jerusalem, built the Temple and the altars, and offered all the sacrifices ordained in the Torah. Rabbi Aha said in the name of Rabbi Hanina ben Pappa that God accounts studying the sacrifices as equivalent to offering them. Rav Huna taught that God said that engaging in studying Mishnah is as if one were offering up sacrifices. Samuel taught that God said that engaging in the study of the law is like building the Temple. And the Avot of Rabbi Natan taught that God loves Torah study more than sacrifice.

Rabbi Ammi taught that Abraham asked God if Israel would come to sin, would God punish them as God punished the generation of the Flood and the generation of the Tower of Babel. God answered that God would not. Abraham then asked God in Genesis 15:8: "How shall I know?" God replied in Genesis 15:9: "Take Me a heifer of three years old . . ." (indicating that Israel would obtain forgiveness through sacrifices). Abraham then asked God what Israel would do when the Temple no longer existed. God replied that whenever Jews read the Biblical text dealing with sacrifices, God would reckon it as if they were bringing an offering and forgiving all their iniquities.

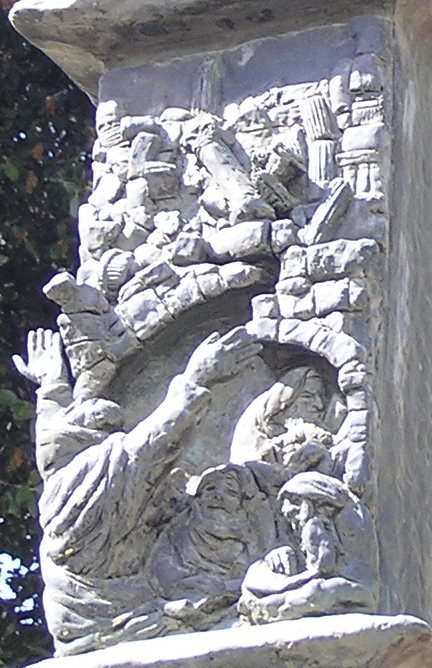
Joḥanan ben Zakai (detail from The Knesset Menorah in Jerusalem)

The Gemara taught that when Rav Sheshet fasted, on concluding his prayer, he added a prayer that God knew that when the Temple still stood, if people sinned, they used to bring sacrifices (according to Leviticus 4:27–35 and 7:2–5), and though they offered only the animal's fat and blood, atonement was granted. Rav Sheshet continued that he had fasted and his fat and blood had diminished, so he asked that it be God's will to account for Rav Sheshet's fat and blood that had been diminished as if he had offered them on the Altar.

Rabbi Isaac declared that prayer is greater than sacrifice.

The Avot of Rabbi Natan taught that as Rabban Joḥanan ben Zakai and Rabbi Joshua were leaving Jerusalem, Rabbi Joshua expressed sorrow that the place where the Israelites had atoned for their iniquities had been destroyed. But Rabban Joḥanan ben Zakai told him not to grieve, for we have in acts of loving-kindness another atonement as effective as sacrifice at the Temple, as Hosea 6:6 says, "For I desire mercy, and not sacrifice."

Rabbi Leazar ben Menahem taught that the opening words of Leviticus 1:1, "And the Lord called," indicated God's proximity to Moses. Rabbi Leazar taught that the words of Proverbs 15:29, "The Lord is far from the wicked," refer to the prophets of other nations. But the continuation of Proverbs 15:29, "He hears the prayer of the righteous," refers to the prophets of Israel. God appears to nations other than Israel only as one who comes from a distance, as Isaiah 39:3 says, "They came from a far country to me." But in connection with the prophets of Israel, Genesis 18:1 says, "And the Lord appeared," and Leviticus 1:1 says, "And the Lord called," implying from the immediate vicinity. Rabbi Haninah compared the difference between the prophets of Israel and the prophets of other nations to a king who was with his friend in a chamber (separated by a curtain). Whenever the king desired to speak to his friend, he folded up the curtain and spoke to him. (But God says to the prophets of other nations without folding back the curtain.) The Rabbis compared it to a king with a wife and a concubine; to his wife, he goes openly, but to his concubine, he repairs with stealth. Similarly, God appears to non-Jews only at night, as Numbers 22:20 says, "And God came to Balaam at night," and Genesis 31:24 says, "And God came to Laban the Aramean in a dream of the night."

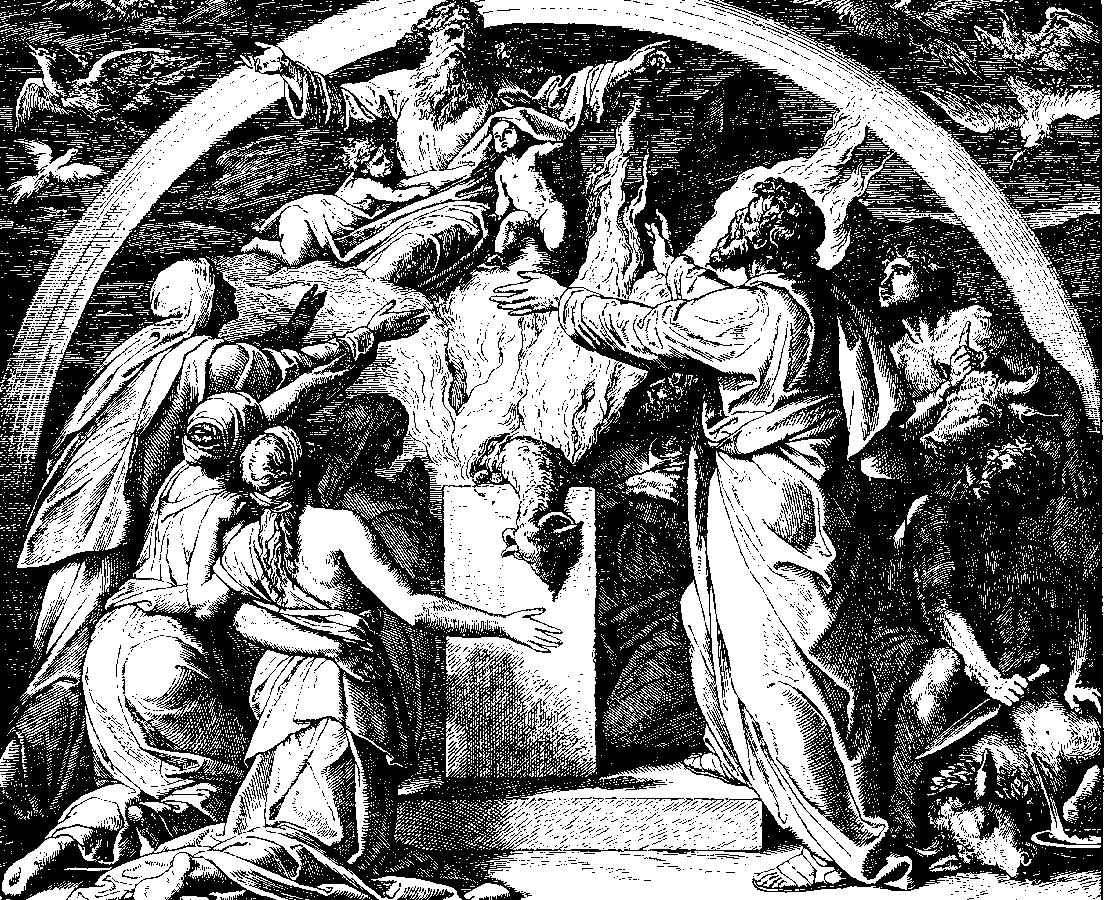
Sacrifices (woodcut by Julius Schnorr von Carolsfeld from the 1860 Die Bibel in Bildern)

The Sifra cited Leviticus 1:1 along with Exodus 3:4 for the proposition that whenever God spoke to Moses, God first called out to him. And the Sifra deduced from God's calling "to him" in Leviticus 1:1 that God meant to speak to Moses alone, to the exclusion of even Aaron. Rabbi Judah ben Betera noted that God spoke to Moses and Aaron together in 13 passages, and to Moses alone in 13 passages, teaching that in these latter passages, Moses was then to inform Aaron. And Rabbi Jose the Galilean deduced from the use of "at the tent of meeting" in Leviticus 1:1 that every time that God spoke to Moses at the tent of meeting, God spoke to Moses alone, to the exclusion of Aaron. Rabbi Tanḥum ben Ḥanilai found in God's calling to Moses alone in Leviticus 1:1 proof that a burden that is too heavy for 600,000—hearing the voice of God (see Deuteronomy 5:22)—can nonetheless be light for one. And the Sifra also deduced from Leviticus 1:1 that God's voice, perhaps because it was subdued, resonated only within the tent itself.

Rabbi Tanḥuma said in the name of Rabbi Joshua ben Korchah that Leviticus 1:1 demonstrated that out of the 10 different names that Scripture applied to Moses, God always addressed Moses by his given name.

The Sifra taught that the term "any man" (אָדָם, adam) in Leviticus 1:2 encompassed converts. But the term "of you" excluded apostates.

Rabbi Judah read Leviticus 1:2, "Speak to the children (בְּנֵי, benei) of Israel," to mean that the "sons" (בְּנֵי, benei) of Israel could lay hands (סמיכה, smichah) on a sacrifice before it was offered, but not the "daughters" (בְּנוֹת, benot) of Israel. Rabbi Jose and Rabbi Simeon, however, disagreed, teaching that women also could lay hands on sacrifices. Abaye taught that a Baraita followed Rabbi Jose and Rabbi Simeon when it taught that both women and children can blow the shofar on Rosh Hashanah.

The Jerusalem Talmud read the apparently superfluous clause "and say to them" in Leviticus 1:2 to teach that the obligation to bring offerings applied to slaves as much as to free persons.

Rabbi Simeon ben Yoḥai taught that, generally speaking, the Torah required a burnt offering only as expiation for sinful meditation of the heart.

The Mishnah taught that the burnt offering was an offering of the most sacred order. It was consumed in its entirety, with the exception of its hide, by the fire of the altar.

The Mishnah deduced from Leviticus 1:3 that the offerer only effected atonement if the offerer brought the offering voluntarily, but if the offerer pledged to bring a burnt offering, the Mishnah taught that they compelled the offerer to state that the offering was voluntary. The Rabbis in a Baraita read the words "he shall offer it" in Leviticus 1:3 to teach that the congregation needed to compel the offerer to fulfill the offerer's obligation. And the Mishnah taught that the intention of the priest conducting the sacrifice determined whether the offering would prove valid.

A Tanna recited before Rabbi Isaac bar Abba the words of Leviticus 9:16, "And he presented the burnt offering; and offered it according to the ordinance," which refer to the obligatory burnt offering that Leviticus 9:2 required Aaron to bring on the eighth day of his consecration. The Tanna reasoned that by saying "according to the ordinance," Leviticus 9:16 referred to the rules that Leviticus 1:3–9 applied to voluntary burnt offerings, and thus taught that those rules also applied to obligatory burnt offerings. The Tanna concluded that as Leviticus 1:4 required laying on of hands for voluntary burnt offerings, the law also required laying on of hands for obligatory burnt offerings.

The Gemara interpreted the requirement of Leviticus 1:5 that the priest "dash the blood round about against the altar" to teach that the priest threw the blood against two opposing corners of the altar, thus hitting all four sides of the altar and satisfying the requirement to dash the altar "round about."

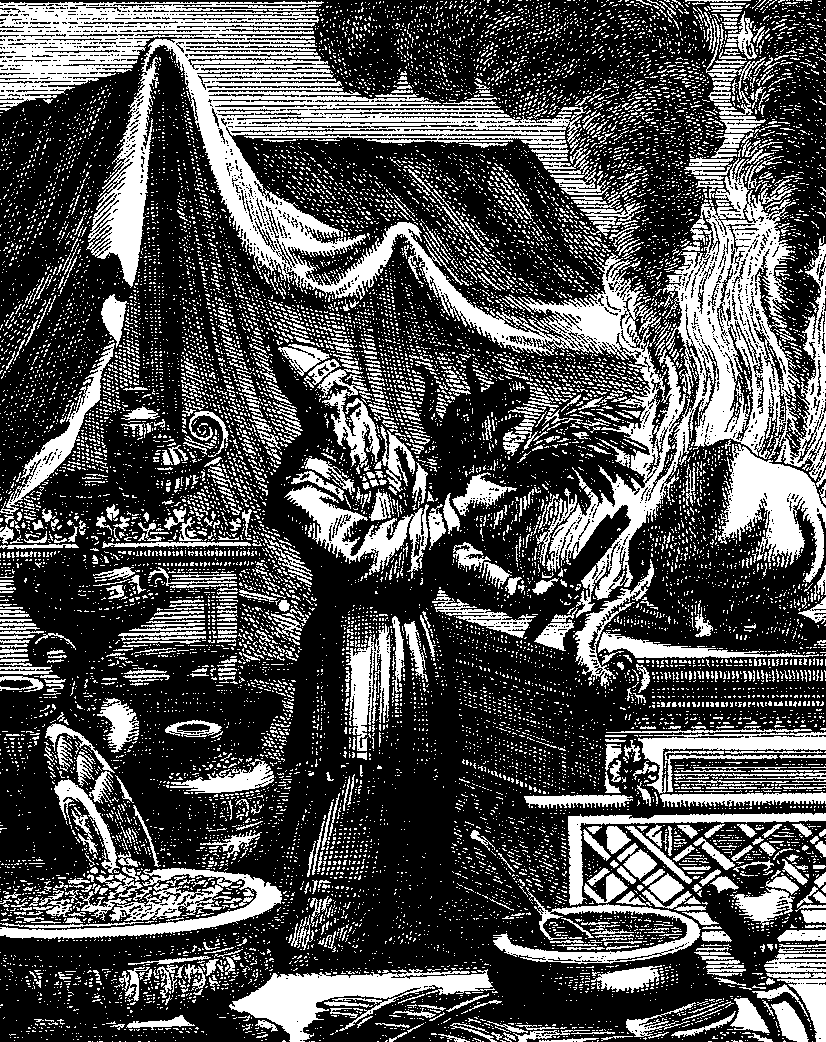
Priestly Duties (1695 woodcut by Johann Christoph Weigel)

Rabbi Eliezer (or some say Rabbi Eliezer ben Jacob) taught that Nadab and Abihu died in Leviticus 10:2 only because they gave a legal decision interpreting Leviticus 1:7 in the presence of their Master Moses. Even though Leviticus 9:24 reports that "fire came forth from before the Lord and consumed the burnt offering and the fat on the altar," Nadab and Abihu deduced from the command of Leviticus 1:7 that "the sons of Aaron the priest shall put fire upon the altar" that the priests still had a religious duty to bring some ordinary fire to the altar, as well.

The Mishnah noted that Leviticus 1:9; 1:17; and 2:9 each use the same words, "an offering made by fire, of a sweet savor to the Lord," whether to describe the burnt offering of a beast, a bird offering, or even a meal offering. (And Leviticus 5:7; 5:11; 12:8; and 14:21–22 provided that people of lesser means could bring less-expensive offerings.) The Mishnah deduced from this that one who sacrificed much and one who sacrificed little attained equal merit, so long as the donors directed their hearts to Heaven. Rabbi Zera taught that Ecclesiastes 5:11 provided a Scriptural proof for this when it says, "Sweet is the sleep of a serving man, whether he eat little or much." Rav Adda bar Ahavah taught that Ecclesiastes 5:10 provided a Scriptural proof for this when it says, "When goods increase, they are increased who eat them; and what advantage is there to the owner thereof." Rabbi Simeon ben Azzai taught that Scripture says of a large ox, "An offering made by fire of a sweet savor"; of a small bird, "An offering made by fire of a sweet savor"; and of a meal offering, "An offering made by fire of a sweet savor." Rabbi Simeon ben Azzai thus taught that Scripture uses the same expression each time to teach that it is the same whether people offered much or little, so long as they directed their hearts to Heaven. And Rabbi Isaac asked why the meal offering was distinguished in that Leviticus 2:1 uses the word "soul" (נֶפֶשׁ, nefesh) to refer to the donor of a meal offering, instead of the usual "man" (אָדָם, adam, in Leviticus 1:2, or אִישׁ, ish, in Leviticus 7:8) used in connection with other sacrifices. Rabbi Isaac taught that Leviticus 2:1 uses the word "soul" (נֶפֶשׁ, nefesh) because God noted that the one who usually brought a meal offering was a poor man, and God accounted it as if the poor man had offered his own soul.

Similarly, Leviticus Rabbah reports that Rabbi Joshua of Siknin taught in the name of Rabbi Levi that God tried to accommodate the Israelites' financial condition, as God told them that whoever had become liable to bring a sacrifice should bring from the herd, as Leviticus 1:3 says, "If his offering be a burnt offering of the herd." But if the offerer could not afford a sacrifice from the herd, then the offerer could bring a lamb, as Leviticus 4:32 says, "And if he bring a lamb . . . ." If the offerer could not afford to bring a lamb, then the offerer could bring a goat, as Leviticus 3:12 says, "And if his offering be a goat." If the offerer could not afford to bring a goat, then the offerer could bring a bird, as Leviticus 1:14 says, "And if his offering . . . be . . . of fowls." If the offerer could not afford to bring a bird, then the offerer could bring fine flour, as Leviticus 2:1 says, "fine flour for a meal offering." Other offerings could not be offered in halves, but this one was to be offered in halves, as Leviticus 6:12 says, "half thereof in the morning, and half thereof in the evening." And Scripture accounted one who offered it as if offering a sacrifice from one end of the world to the other, as Malachi 1:11 says, "For from the rising of the sun even to the going down of the same, My name is great among the nations; and in every place offerings are presented to My name, even a pure meal offering."

The Mishnah taught that the priest's obligation in Leviticus 1:9 to offer the fats and other sacrificial pieces persisted until dawn.

The Sifra deduced from Leviticus 1:10 that God occasionally began freestanding statements to Moses so as to allow Moses a pause to collect his thoughts. The Sifra generalized from this example that it was all the more appropriate for ordinary people to speak deliberately in conversation with other people.

Tractate Kinnim in the Mishnah interpreted the laws of pairs of sacrificial pigeons and doves in Leviticus 1:14, 5:7, 12:6–8, 14:22, and 15:29; and Numbers 6:10.

=== Leviticus chapter 2 ===
Tractate Menachot in the Mishnah, Tosefta, and Talmud interpreted the law of meal offerings in Leviticus 2.

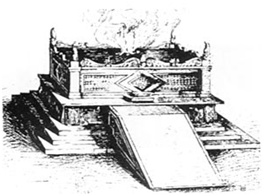
The altar of the tabernacle (illustration from Philip Y. Pendleton. Standard Eclectic Commentary. Cincinnati: Standard Publishing Co., 1901.)

Rabbi Shimon ben Lakish (Resh Lakish) noted that Scripture uses the word "covenant" with regard to salt in Leviticus 2:13, "The salt of the covenant with your God should not be excluded from your meal offering; with all your sacrifices you must offer salt," and with regard to afflictions in Deuteronomy 28:69, "These are the words of the covenant." Rabbi Shimon taught that just as, in the covenant mentioned with regard to salt, the salt sweetens the taste of the meal and renders it edible, so too in the covenant mentioned with regard to suffering, suffering cleanses a person's transgressions, purifying a person for a more sublime existence.

=== Leviticus chapter 3 ===
The Gemara deduced from the words "And if his offering be a sacrifice of peace offerings" in Leviticus 3:1 that for an offering to be effective, one needed to slaughter the sacrifice for the sake of its being a peace offering.

Rabbi Judah taught that whoever brought a peace offering brought peace to the world. Rabbi Simeon taught that they are called "peace offerings" because all are at peace, each sharing in them. The blood and the limbs were for the altar, the breast and the thigh for the priests, and the hide and the meat for the owner.

Rabbi Simeon interpreted the term "peace offering" (שְׁלָמִים, shelamim) in Leviticus 3:1 and after to indicate that a person could bring the offering only when "whole" (שָׁלֵם, shalem), and thus not when one was in the first stage of mourning after the death of a close relative.

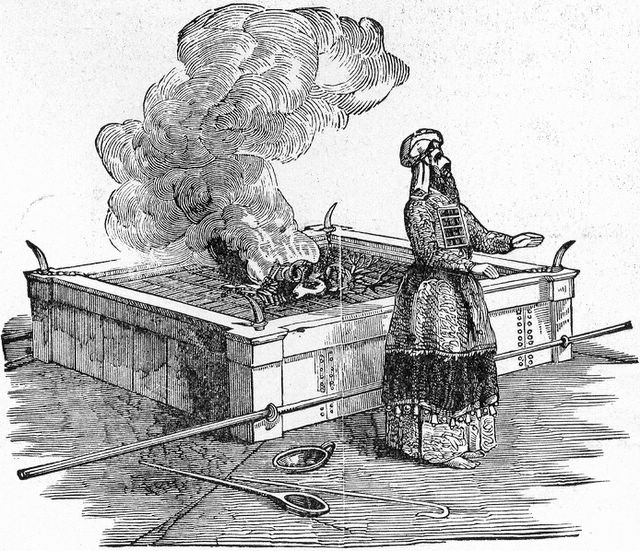
High Priest Offering a Sacrifice of a Goat (illustration from Henry Davenport Northrop. Treasures of the Bible. International Pub. Co., 1894.)

Interpreting the words "And he shall . . . kill it at the door of the tent of meeting" in Leviticus 3:2, Rav Judah deduced in the name of Samuel that the priest had to kill the sacrifice when the gate was open, not when the gate was closed, and thus that peace offerings slain before the doors of the Temple were opened were invalid.

The Mishnah taught that because the peace offering was a sacrifice of lesser sanctity, it could be slain in any part of the Temple court. The Rabbis taught in a Baraita that the Mishnah's rule could be derived from the words "And he shall . . . kill it at the door of the tent of meeting" in Leviticus 3:2, "And he shall . . . kill it before the tent of meeting" in Leviticus 3:8, and "And he shall . . . kill it before the tent of meeting" in Leviticus 3:13. The three verses taken together taught that all sides of the Temple court were fit for performing sacrifices of lesser sanctity.

The Gemara deduced from the words "And the priest shall make it smoke" in Leviticus 3:11 that the priest must not mix portions of one sacrifice with those of another. And the Gemara cited a Baraita to interpret the words "And the priest shall make them smoke" Leviticus 3:16 to teach that the priest had to burn all the sacrificed parts of an offering at the same time.

A Midrash interpreted Psalm 146:7, "The Lord lets loose the prisoners," to read, "The Lord permits the forbidden," and thus to teach that what God forbade in one case, God permitted in another. Thus, God forbade the abdominal fat of cattle in Leviticus 3:3, but permitted it in the case of beasts. God forbade consuming the sciatic nerve in animals (in Genesis 32:33) but permitted it in fowl. God forbade eating meat without ritual slaughter (in Leviticus 17:1–4) but permitted it for fish. Similarly, Rabbi Abba and Rabbi Jonathan in the name of Rabbi Levi taught that God permitted more things than God forbade. For example, God counterbalanced the prohibition of pork (in Leviticus 11:7 and Deuteronomy 14:7–8) by permitting mullet (which some say tastes like pork).

Leviticus 3:16–17 reserved for God all animal fat and blood. The Gemara recounted that when Rabbi Sheshet would fast, he would pray: "Master of the Universe, it is revealed before You that when the Temple is standing, one sins and offers a sacrifice. And although only its fat and blood were offered from that sacrifice on the altar, [the offerer's] transgression is atoned for. And now, I sat in observance of a fast and my fat and blood diminished. May it be Your will that my fat and blood that diminished be considered as if I offered a sacrifice before You on the altar, and may I find favor in Your eyes."

The Sages taught that one may trust butchers to remove the fat that Leviticus 3:17 and 7:23 forbids.

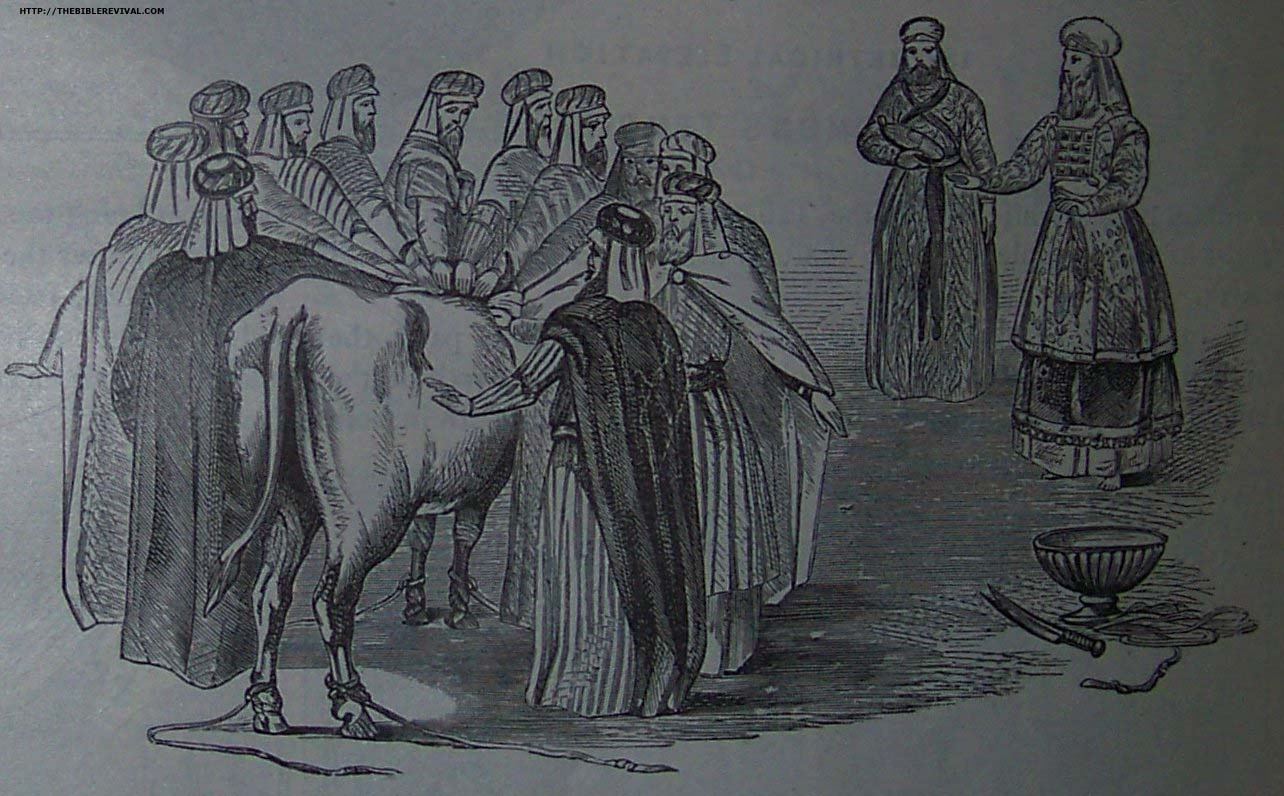
The National Sin Offering (illustration from the 1890 Holman Bible)

=== Leviticus chapter 4 ===
Reading Leviticus 4:3–21, the Mishnah noted that the person who burned the bull (as well as the person who led away the scapegoat pursuant to Leviticus 16:7–10 and 26, the person who burned the bull burned pursuant to Leviticus 16:27, and the person who burned the red cow pursuant to Numbers 19:8) rendered unclean the clothes worn while so doing. But the bull (as well as the scapegoat, the other bull, and the red cow) did not itself render unclean clothes with which it came in contact. The Mishnah imagined the clothing saying to the person: "Those that render you unclean do not render me unclean, but you render me unclean."

Tractate Horayot in the Mishnah, Tosefta, Jerusalem Talmud, and Babylonian Talmud interpreted the laws of the High Priest's bull in Leviticus 4:1–12, the bull for a communal error in Leviticus 4:13–21, the goat of the Nasi (Hebrew title) in Leviticus 4:22–26, and the sin offerings in Leviticus 4:27–5:12, and 5:17–19.

The Rabbis interpreted the words, "If any one shall sin through error," in Leviticus 4:2 to apply to inadvertent transgressions.

The Mishnah taught that 36 transgressions warranted excision ("the soul shall be cut off," נִכְרְתָה הַנֶּפֶשׁ, nichretah ha-nefesh) if committed intentionally, and warranted bringing of a sin offering (חַטָּאת, chatat), as in Leviticus 4:2, if committed inadvertently: when a man has intercourse with (1) his mother, (2) his father's wife, (3) his daughter-in-law, (4) another man, or (5) an animal; (6) when a woman has intercourse with an animal; when a man has intercourse with (7) a woman and her daughter, (8) a married woman, (9) his sister, (10) his father's sister, (11) his mother's sister, (12) his wife's sister, (13) his brother's wife, (14) the wife of his father's brother, or (15) a menstruating woman; when one (16) blasphemes, (17) serves idols, (18) dedicates children to Molech, (19) has a familiar spirit, (20) desecrates the Sabbath, (21) eats of sacrificial food while unclean, (22) enters the precincts of the Temple in an unclean state, eats (23) forbidden fat, (24) blood, (25) remnant, or (26) refuse, (27) slaughters or (28) offers up a consecrated animal outside the Temple precincts, (29) eats anything leavened on Passover, (30) eats or (31) works on Yom Kippur, compounds sacred (32) anointing oil or (33) incense, (34) uses sacred anointing oil improperly, or transgresses the laws of (35) the Passover offering or (36) circumcision.

Reading Genesis 15:9, "And He said to him: 'Take me a heifer of three years old (מְשֻׁלֶּשֶׁת, meshuleshet), a she-goat of three years old (מְשֻׁלֶּשֶׁת, meshuleshet), and a ram of three years old (מְשֻׁלָּשׁ, meshulash),'" a Midrash read מְשֻׁלֶּשֶׁת, meshuleshet, to mean "three-fold" or "three kinds," indicating sacrifices for three different purposes. The Midrash deduced that God thus showed Abraham three kinds of bullocks, three kinds of goats, and three kinds of rams that Abraham's descendants would need to sacrifice. The three kinds of bullocks were: (1) the bullock that Leviticus 16:3–19 would require the Israelites to sacrifice on the Day of Atonement (יוֹם כִּיפּוּר, Yom Kippur), (2) the bullock that Leviticus 4:13–21 would require the Israelites to bring on account of unwitting transgression of the law, and (3) the heifer whose neck Deuteronomy 21:1–9 would require the Israelites to break. The three kinds of goats were: (1) the goats that Numbers 28:16–29:39 would require the Israelites to sacrifice on festivals, (2) the goats that Numbers 28:11–15 would require the Israelites to sacrifice on the New Moon (ראש חודש, Rosh Chodesh), and (3) the goat that Leviticus 4:27–31 would require an individual to bring. The three kinds of rams were: (1) the guilt offering of certain obligation that Leviticus 5:25, for example, would require one who committed a trespass to bring, (2) the guilt offering of doubt to which one would be liable when in doubt whether one had committed a transgression, and (3) the lamb to be brought by an individual. Rabbi Simeon ben Yoḥai said that God showed Abraham all the atoning sacrifices except for the tenth of an ephah of fine meal in Leviticus 5:11. The Rabbis said that God showed Abraham the tenth of an ephah as well, for Genesis 15:10 says "all these (אֵלֶּה, eleh)," just as Leviticus 2:8 says, "And you shall bring the meal offering that is made of these things (מֵאֵלֶּה, me-eleh)," and the use of "these" in both verses hints that both verses refer to the same thing. And reading Genesis 15:10, "But the bird divided he not," the Midrash deduced that God intimated to Abraham that the bird burnt offering would be divided, but the bird sin offering (which the dove and young pigeon symbolized) would not be divided.

Reading Leviticus 4:22, "When (אֲשֶׁר, asher) a ruler (נָשִׂיא, nasi) sins," Rabban Joḥanan ben Zakai said, "Happy (אַשְׁרֵי, ashrei) is the generation whose leader (נָשִׂיא, nasi) is strong enough to admit having sinned!"

The Mishnah taught that bringing the sin offering (חַטָּאת, chatat) of Leviticus 4:27–35 atoned for sin.

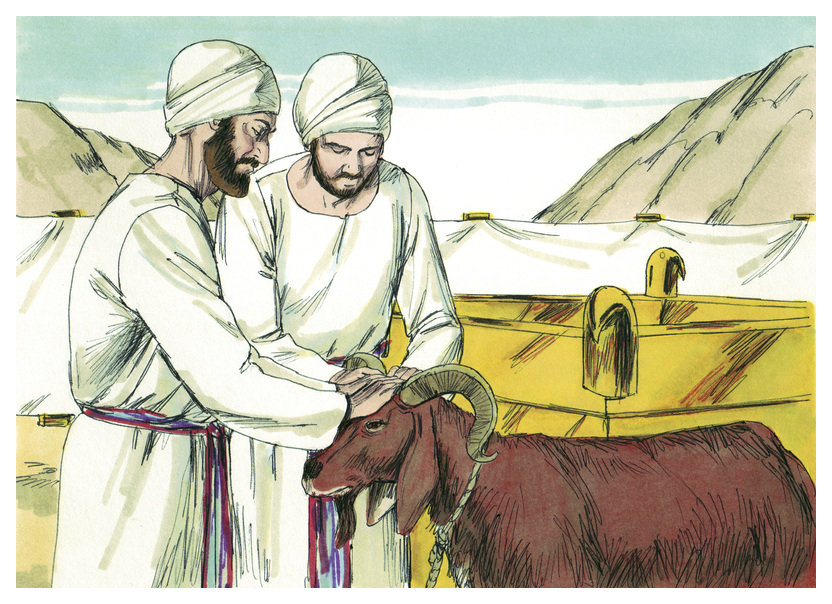
Priests Preparing an Offering (1984 illustration by Jim Padgett, courtesy of Sweet Publishing)

=== Leviticus chapter 5 ===
Rabbi Joshua of Siknin taught in the name of Rabbi Levi that Leviticus 5 uses the word "soul" (נֶפֶשׁ, nefesh) six times, corresponding to the six days of Creation. God said to the soul that all that God created in the six days of creation God created for the sake of the soul, and then the soul went and sinned! And thus, Leviticus 5:1 begins, "When a soul sins . . . ."

Tractates Nedarim and Shevuot in the Mishnah, Tosefta, Jerusalem Talmud, and Babylonian Talmud interpreted the laws of vows and oaths in Exodus 20:7, Leviticus 5:1–10 and 19:12, Numbers 30:2–17, and Deuteronomy 23:24.

The Mishnah supposed that a witness, after having been cautioned about the grave responsibility of being a witness, would think that the witness should just avoid the trouble of testifying. The Mishnah taught that this is why Leviticus 5:1 says, "And he witnessed or saw or knew, if didn't say anything, he bears the sin." (And thus the witness must testify.)

The Mishnah (following Leviticus 5:7–8) taught that a sin offering of a bird preceded a burnt offering of a bird; and the priest also dedicated them in that order. Rabbi Eliezer taught that wherever an offerer (because of poverty) substituted for an animal sin offering the offering of two birds (one of which was for a sin offering and the other for a burnt offering), the priest sacrificed the bird sin offering before the bird burnt offering (as Leviticus 5:7–8 instructs). But in the case of a woman after childbirth discussed in Leviticus 12:8 (where a poor new mother could substitute for an animal burnt offering two birds, one for a sin offering and the other for a burnt offering), the bird burnt offering took precedence over the bird sin offering. Wherever the offering came on account of sin, the sin offering took precedence. But here (in the case of a woman after childbirth, where the sin offering was not on account of sin) the burnt offering took precedence. And wherever both birds came instead of one animal sin offering, the sin offering took precedence. But here (in the case of a woman after childbirth) they did not both come on account of a sin offering (for in poverty she substituted a bird burnt offering for an animal burnt offering, as Leviticus 12:6–7 required her to bring a bird sin offering in any case), the burnt offering took precedence. (The Gemara asked whether this contradicted the Mishnah, which taught that a bird sin offering took precedence over an animal burnt offering, whereas here she brought the animal burnt offering before the bird sin offering.) Rava taught that Leviticus 12:6–7 merely accorded the bird burnt offering precedence in the mentioning. (Thus, some read Rava to teach that Leviticus 12:6–8 lets the reader read first about the burnt offering, but in fact the priest sacrificed the sin offering first. Others read Rava to teach that one first dedicated the animal or bird for the burnt offering and then dedicated the bird for the sin offering, but in fact the priest sacrificed the sin offering first.)

A Midrash deduced from the instructions in Leviticus 5:11–13 for the poor person to bring meal offerings that God valued the poor person's offering.

Chapter 9 of Tractate Bava Kamma in the Mishnah and Babylonian Talmud and chapters 9 and 10 in the Tosefta interpreted the laws of restitution in Leviticus 5:21–26 together with Numbers 5:6–8.

The Mishnah taught that if one stole from another something worth a perutah (the minimum amount of significant value) and the thief nonetheless swore that the thief did not do so, the thief was obliged to take restitution to the victim even if the thief needed to go as far as Media (in what is now Iran). The thief could not give restitution to the victim's son or agent, but the thief could give it to an agent of the court. If the victim died, the thief had to restore it to the victim's heirs.

The Mishnah taught that if the thief paid back the principal to the victim but did not pay the additional fifth required by Leviticus 5:24; or if the victim excused the thief the principal but not the fifth; or the victim excused the thief both the principal and the fifth, except for something less than the value of a perutah remaining of the principal, then the thief would not have to go after the victim to repay the victim. (The Mishnah did not consider the payment of the fifth as an essential condition of atonement.) If, however, the thief paid the victim the fifth but not the principal; or the victim excused the thief the fifth but not the principal; or even where the victim excused the thief for both, except for something more than the value of a perutah remaining of the principal, then the thief would have to convey it personally to the victim (even as far as Media).

The Mishnah taught that if the thief paid the principal back to the victim and took an oath falsely that the thief had paid the fifth required by Leviticus 5:24, the thief would have to pay the victim an additional fifth of the fifth and so on until the principal of the last fifth about which the thief swore was reduced to less than the value of a perutah.

The Mishnah taught that the rules of restitution also applied to the case of a deposit, as Leviticus 5:21–22 says: "In that which was delivered him to keep, or in fellowship, or in a thing taken away by violence, or has deceived his neighbor, or has found that which was lost and lies concerning it and swears falsely." The custodian had to pay the principal and the fifth required by Leviticus 5:24 and bring a trespass offering as required by Leviticus 5:25. If the depositor asked where the thing deposited was, and an unpaid custodian replied that it was lost, and the depositor then imposed an oath on the custodian, and the custodian swore that the deposit was lost, if witnesses then testified that the custodian consumed the thing deposited, then the custodian had to repay the principal. If the custodian confessed, the custodian had to pay the principal together with a fifth and bring a trespass offering, as required by Leviticus 5:21–24. If, however, the depositor asked where the thing deposited was, and the custodian replied that it was stolen, and the depositor then imposed an oath on the custodian, and the custodian swore that the someone else took the thing deposited, if witnesses testified that the custodian stole it, then the custodian had to repay double as required by Exodus 22:8. But if the custodian confessed on the custodian's own accord, then the custodian had to repay the principal together with a fifth and bring a trespass offering, as required by Leviticus 5:21–24.

The Mishnah taught that if one stole from one's father and, when charged by the father, denied it on oath, and the father then died before the child confessed to the father's heirs, then the child would have to repay the principal and a fifth to the father's other children or to the father's brothers (the child's uncles) if the child had no siblings. But if the child was unwilling to forfeit the child's share in the payment that child had to make, or if the child had no resources, then the child was to borrow the amount from others and perform the duty of restoration to the heirs, and the creditors could subsequently come and demand to be paid the portion that would by law have belonged to the child as heir.

The Mishnah interpreted the requirements of Numbers 5:8 regarding restitution where the victim died without kin to apply as well to where a proselyte victim died. The wrongdoer would have to pay the priests the principal plus 20 percent and bring a trespass offering to the altar. If the wrongdoer died bringing the money and the offering to Jerusalem, the money was to go to the wrongdoer's heirs, and the offering was to be kept on the pasture until it became blemished, when it was to be sold and the proceeds were to go to the fund for freewill offerings. But if the wrongdoer had already given the money to the priest and then died, the heirs could not retrieve the funds, for Numbers 5:10 provides that "whatever any man gives to the priest shall be his."

The Mishnah taught that an offering that was more sacred than another preceded the other offering. If there was blood of a sin offering and blood of a burnt offering to be presented, the blood of the sin offering preceded the blood of the burnt offering, because it effected atonement for severe transgressions punishable by extirpation. If there were portions of a burnt offering and portions of a sin offering to be burned on the altar, the burning of the portions of the burnt offering preceded the portions of the sin offering, because the burnt offering was entirely burned in the flames on the altar, while only part of the sin offering was burned. Similarly, although both effect atonement, a sin offering preceded a guilt offering, because its blood was placed on the four corners of the altar and the remnants of its blood were poured on the base of the altar, while the blood of the guilt offering was sprinkled on only two corners of the altar. A guilt offering preceded a thank offering and the Nazirite's ram, as it was an offering of the most sacred order, and the others were offerings of lesser sanctity. A thank offering and a Nazirite's ram preceded a peace offering, as they were eaten in one day, like offerings of the most sacred order, while a peace offering was eaten for two days, and the thank offering and Nazirite's ram required loaves to be brought with them. Sacrifice of the peace offering preceded sacrifice of the firstborn offering, as the peace offering required placing the blood on the altar, placing hands on the head of the offering, libations, and the waving of the breast and the thigh by the priest and the owner, none of which was required for the firstborn offering.

== In medieval Jewish interpretation ==
The parashah is discussed in these medieval Jewish sources:

=== Leviticus chapters 1–7 ===
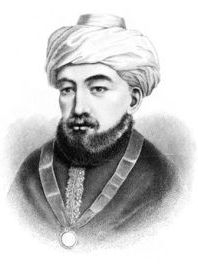
Maimonides

Maimonides and Nachmanides differed about the reason for the sacrificial system. Maimonides wrote that the reason for the offerings was because when the Israelites lived in Egypt and Chaldea, the Egyptians worshipped sheep and the Chaldeans worshipped demons in the form of goats. And people in India never slaughter cattle. Thus, God commanded the Israelites to slaughter cattle, sheep, and goats to God, so that worshipers of the other lands would know that God required the very act that they considered to be the utmost sin, and through that act God would forgive Israel's sins. God thus intended to cure the people of the other nations of false beliefs, which Maimonides characterized as diseases of the soul, for diseases are healed by medicines that are antithetical to the diseases.

Maimonides taught that God instituted the practice of sacrifices as a transitional step to wean the Israelites from the worship of the times and move them toward prayer as the primary means of worship. Maimonides noted that in nature, God created animals that develop gradually. For example, when a mammal is born, it is extremely tender, and cannot eat dry food, so God provided breasts that yield milk to feed the young animal, until it can eat dry food. Similarly, Maimonides taught, God instituted many laws as temporary measures, as it would have been impossible for the Israelites to suddenly discontinue everything to which they had become accustomed. So God sent Moses to make the Israelites (in the words of Exodus 19:6) "a kingdom of priests and a holy nation." But the general custom of worship in those days was sacrificing animals in temples that contained idols. So God did not command the Israelites to give up those manners of service, but allowed them to continue. God transferred to God's service what had formerly served as a worship of idols, and commanded the Israelites to serve God in the same manner—namely, to build to a Sanctuary (Exodus 25:8), to erect the altar to God's name (Exodus 20:21), to offer sacrifices to God (Leviticus 1:2), to bow down to God, and to burn incense before God. God forbad doing any of these things to any other being and selected priests for the service in the Temple in Exodus 28:41. By this Divine plan, God blotted out the traces of idolatry, and established the great principle of the Existence and Unity of God. But the sacrificial service, Maimonides taught, was not the primary object of God's commandments about sacrifice; rather, supplications, prayers, and similar kinds of worship are nearer to the primary object. Thus, God limited sacrifice to only one Temple (see Deuteronomy 12:26) and the priesthood to only the members of a particular family. These restrictions, Maimonides taught, served to limit sacrificial worship, and kept it within such bounds that God did not feel it necessary to abolish sacrificial service altogether. But in the Divine plan, prayer and supplication can be offered everywhere and by every person, as can be the wearing of tzitzit (Numbers 15:38) and tefillin (Exodus 13:9, 16) and similar kinds of service.

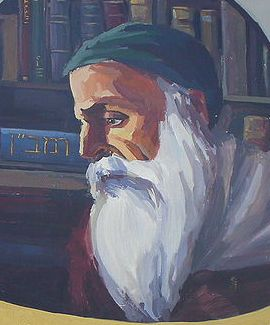
Nachmanides

Nachmanides, on the other hand, noted that Leviticus 3:16 mentioned a reason for the offerings—that they are "a fire offering, of a pleasing odor to the Eternal." Nachmanides rejected the argument that the offerings were meant to eliminate the foreigners' foolish ideas, for the sacrifices would not have that effect, as the foreigners' intention was to worship the constellations of the sheep and the ox, and if Jews slaughtered sheep and oxen to God, it would show respect and honor to those constellations. Nachmanides further noted that when Noah came out of the ark, there were as yet no Chaldeans or Egyptians in the world, yet Noah brought an offering that pleased God so much that Genesis 8:21 reports that on its account God said, "I will not again curse the ground anymore for man's sake." Similarly, Abel brought of the first-born of his flock and Genesis 4:4 reports that "the Eternal had regard to Abel and to his offering," but there had not yet been a trace of idol worship in the world. In Numbers 23:4, Balaam said, "I have prepared the seven altars, and I have offered up a bullock and a ram on every altar," but his intent was not to eradicate evil beliefs from Balak's mind, but rather to approach God so that God's communication would reach Balaam. Nachmanides argued that the reason for the offerings was more likely that since people's deeds are accomplished through thought, speech, and action, therefore God commanded that when people sin and bring an offering, they should lay their hands on it in contrast to the evil deed that they committed. Offerers would confess their sin verbally to contrast with their evil speech. They would burn parts of the animal in fire that were seen as the instruments of thought and desire in human beings. The offerers would burn the legs of the animal because they corresponded to the limbs with which the offerer acted. The offerer sprinkled blood on the altar, which is analogous to the blood in the offerer's body. Nachmanides argued that offerers performed these acts so that the offerers should realize that the offerers had sinned against God with their bodies. And the offerer's soul and blood should have been spilled and the offerer's body burned, were it not for God's loving-kindness in taking a substitute and a ransom—the offering—so that the offering's blood should be in place of the offerer's blood, its life in place of the offerer's life, and that the limbs of the offering in place of the parts of the offerer's body.

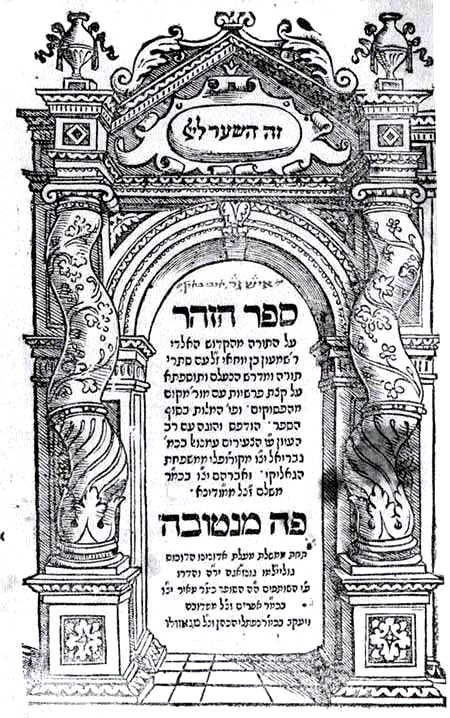
The Zohar

=== Leviticus chapter 4 ===
Reading Leviticus 4:22, "When a ruler sins," the Zohar pointed out that the corresponding clauses referring to the High Priest and the congregation begin with the word "if"—"If the anointed priest shall sin . . ." in Leviticus 4:3 and "If the whole congregation of Israel shall err . . ." in Leviticus 4:13. Rabbi Isaac explained that the reason for the differing language was that it was exceptional for the High Priest to sin, since he felt his responsibility to God, Israel, and each individual. Similarly, it was very exceptional for the whole congregation to commit one and the same sin, for if some committed it, others would not. But a ruler heart is uplifted because of the ruler's power, and therefore the ruler is almost bound to sin; hence it says here "when" and not "if."

== In modern interpretation ==
The parashah is discussed in these modern sources:

=== Leviticus chapters 1–7 ===
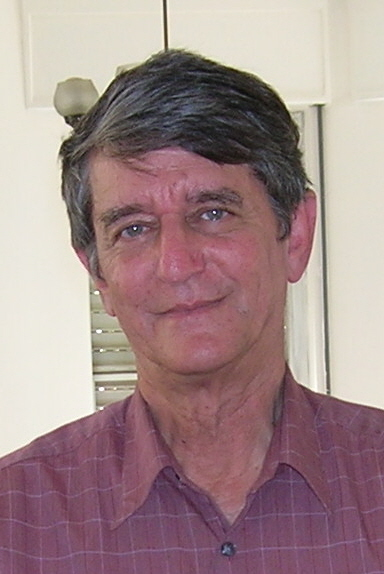
Kugel

James Kugel reported that ancient texts offered several explanations for why peoples of the ancient Near East sacrificed animals: to provide the deity food (see Numbers 28:2); to offer the life of the slaughtered animal as a substitute for the offerer's; to give a costly possession as a sign of fealty or in the hope of receiving still more generous compensation from the deity. Kugel reported that more recent explanations saw the sacrifice as establishing a tangible connection between the offerer and the deity, while others stress the connection of the sacred with violence or see the function of religion as defusing violence that would otherwise be directed at people. Kugel argued that the Israelites conceived of animal sacrifices as the principal channel of communication between the people and God. William Hallo described sacrifice as a sacred-making of the human consumption of animal meat that followed.

Jacob Milgrom read the sacrificial system in the parashah to describe the forces of life and death pitted against each other in a cosmic struggle, set loose by people through their obedience to or defiance of God's commandments. Milgrom taught that Leviticus treats impurity as the opposite of holiness, identifying impurity with death and holiness with life. Milgrom interpreted Leviticus to teach that people could drive God out of the sanctuary by polluting it with their moral and ritual sins. But the priests could periodically purge the sanctuary of its impurities and influence the people to atone. The blood of the purification offerings symbolically purged the sanctuary by symbolically absorbing its impurities, in a victory for life over death.

		◄SACRIFICE◄		
	◄sanctify◄		◄cleanse◄	
HOLY		CLEAN		UNCLEAN
	►profane►		►pollute►	
		►SIN and INFIRMITY►		

Similarly, Gordon Wenham noted that the sacrificial system regularly associates sacrifices with cleansing and sanctification. Wenham read Leviticus to teach that sacrificial blood was necessary to cleanse and sanctify. Sacrifice could undo the effects of sin and human infirmity. Sin and disease profaned the holy and polluted the clean, whereas sacrifice could reverse this process. Wenham illustrated with the chart at right. Wenham concluded that contact between the holy and the unclean resulted in death. Sacrifice, by cleansing the unclean, made such contact possible. Sacrifice thus allowed the holy God to meet with sinful man.

Mary Douglas wrote that to find the underlying logic of the first chapters of Leviticus about how to make a sacrifice and how to lay out the animal sections on the altar, one needs to look carefully at what Leviticus says about bodies and parts of bodies, what is inner and outer, and what is on top and underneath. Douglas suggested this alignment of the three levels of Mount Sinai, the animal sacrifice, and the Tabernacle:

Mount Sinai	Animal Offering	Tabernacle
Summit or head, cloud like smoke (Exodus 19:18); God came down to top; access for Moses (Exodus 19:20–22).	Entrails, intestines, genital organs (washed) at the summit of the pile.	Holy of Holies, cherubim, Ark, and Testimony of Covenant.
Perimeter of dense cloud; access restricted to Aaron, two sons, and 70 elders (Exodus 24:1–9).	Midriff area, dense fat covering, kidneys, liver lobe, burnt on altar.	Sanctuary, dense clouds of incense, symmetrical table and lampstand, restricted to priests.
Lower slopes, open access.	Head and meat sections, access to body, food for people and priest.	Outer court, main altar, access for people.
Mountain consecrated (Exodus 19:23).	Animal consecrated (Leviticus 1–7).	Tabernacle consecrated (Leviticus 16).

Douglas argued that the tabernacle ran horizontally toward the most sacred area, Mount Sinai went up vertically to the summit, and the sacrificial pile started with the head underneath and went up to the entrails, and one can interpret each by reference to the others. Douglas noted that in mystical thought, "upper" and "inner" can be equivalent. The pattern is always there throughout creation, with God in the depths or on the heights of everything. Likening the tabernacle to a body, the innards corresponded to the Holy of Holies, for the Bible locates the emotions and thought in the innermost parts of the body; the loins are wrung with remorse or grief; God scrutinizes the innermost part; compassion resides in the bowels. The Tabernacle was associated with creation, and creation with fertility, implying that the innermost part of the Tabernacle was a Divine nuptial chamber, depicting the union between God and Israel. Douglas concluded that the summit of the mountain was the abode of God, below was the cloudy region that only Moses could enter, and the lower slopes were where the priests and congregation waited, and analogously, the order of placing the parts of the animal on the altar marked out three zones on the carcass, the suet set around and below the diaphragm corresponding to the cloud girdling the middle of the mountain.

James Watts argued that the rhetorical purpose of Leviticus 1–7 was to assert the Torah's authority over both religious professionals and laity. No Israelite could claim to be exempt from its provisions. Like royal and oracular texts that their framework evokes, Leviticus 1–7 intended to persuade the Israelites and the priests to perform the offerings correctly, as specified in the text. But Leviticus 1–7 also aimed to reinforce the authority of the Torah over religious performance in the Temple. By publicly stipulating the forms of the Israelite's offerings, Leviticus 1–7 positioned priests and laity to monitor each other's performance, with the text as the arbiter of correct practice. Thus Leviticus 1–7 shifted cultic authority from the priesthood to the book.

Bernard Bamberger noted that while the Rabbis introduced into the synagogue several practices formerly associated with the Temple, they made no provision for "interim" sacrifices, even though they could have found precedents for sacrifice outside Jerusalem. When the Roman Empire destroyed the Jerusalem Temple, the Rabbis did not choose to follow those precedents for sacrifice elsewhere, but instead set up a substitute, declaring the study of the sacrificial laws as acceptable to God as sacrifices. Bamberger suggested that some scholars may have felt that the day of sacrifice had passed.

=== Leviticus chapter 1 ===
Milgrom noted that Leviticus 1–5, like most of Leviticus, is addressed to all the Israelite people, while only a few laws, in Leviticus 6:1–7:21; 10:8–15; and 16:2–28, are reserved for the Priests alone.

Milgrom taught that the burnt offering in Leviticus 1 was intended for the person who wanted to present to God a sacrificial animal in its entirety either as an expression of loyalty or as a request for expiation.

=== Leviticus chapter 2 ===
Milgrom believed that the cereal offering, whose description follows in Leviticus 2, was probably intended for the same purposes as the burnt offering, on behalf of the poor who could not afford entire animal offerings. Milgrom saw in the sacrificial texts a recurring theme of concern for the poor: Everyone, regardless of means, was able to bring an acceptable offering to God. Thus Leviticus 1:14–17 added birds to the roster of burnt offerings, and Leviticus 2 on the cereal offering appears immediately after Leviticus 1 on the burnt offering, implying that if a person could not afford birds, then the person could bring a cereal offering instead.

=== Leviticus chapter 3 ===
Milgrom taught that in the original Priestly source ("P"), an offerer brought the well-being offering in Leviticus 3 solely out of joyous motivations like thanksgiving, vow fulfillment, or spontaneous free will. The offerer shared the meat of the offering with family and friends. Milgrom reasoned that the advent of the Holiness Code ("H") brought another dimension to the sacrifice of the well-being connected with the prohibition of consuming blood. H's ban on nonsacrificial slaughter meant that all meat eaten as food had initially to be sanctified on the altar as a well-being offering.

=== Leviticus chapter 4 ===
Milgrom taught that the rationale for the sin or purification offering in Leviticus 4:1–5:13 was related to the impurity generated by violations of prohibitive commandments, which, if severe enough, polluted the sanctuary from afar. Milgrom called this pollution the Priestly Picture of Dorian Gray: While sin might not scar the face of the sinner, it did scar the face of the sanctuary. This image illustrated a Priestly version of the doctrine of collective responsibility: When evildoers sinned, they brought the more righteous down with them. Those who perished with the wicked were not entirely blameless, but inadvertent sinners who, by having allowed the wicked to flourish, also contributed to pollution of the sanctuary. The High Priest and the leaders of the people, in particular, brought special sacrifices in Leviticus 4:9 and 23, for their errors caused harm to their people, as reflected in Leviticus 4:3 and 10:6. Thus, in the Priestly scheme, brazen sins (the leaders' rapacity) and inadvertent sins (the silent majority's acquiescence) polluted the sanctuary (and corrupted society), driving God out of the sanctuary and leading to national destruction. In the theology of the purification offering, the sanctuary needed constant purification lest God abandon it because of the people's rebellious and inadvertent sins.

=== Leviticus chapter 5 ===
Milgrom taught that the guilt or reparation offering in Leviticus 5:14–26 might seem at first glance to be restricted to offenses against God's sanctum or name, but reflected wider theological implications. The Hebrew noun אָשָׁם, asham, "reparation, reparation offering," is related to the Hebrew verb אָשֵׁם, asheim, "feel guilt," which predominates in this offering in Leviticus 5:17, 23, and 26, and in the purification offering, as well, in Leviticus 4:13, 22, and 27; and 5:4–5. Milgrom inferred from this relationship that expiation by sacrifice depended on both the worshiper's remorse and the reparation that the worshiper brought to both God and people to rectify the wrong. Milgrom noted that if a person falsely denied under oath having defrauded another, subsequently felt guilt, and restored the embezzled property and paid a 20 percent fine, the person was then eligible to request of God that a reparation offering expiate the false oath, as reflected in Leviticus 5:20–26. Milgrom saw here Priestly lawmakers in action, bending the sacrificial rules to foster the growth of individual conscience, permitting sacrificial expiation for a deliberate crime against God (knowingly taking a false oath) provided that the person repented before being apprehended. Thus Leviticus 5:20–26 ordains that repentance converted an intentional sin into an unintentional one, making it eligible for sacrificial expiation.

Milgrom concluded that the sin or purification offering taught the "ecology of morality," that the sins of the individual adversely affect society even when committed inadvertently, and the guilt or reparation offering fostered a doctrine of repentance. Milgrom noted that Leviticus 4:1–5:13 did not prescribe the sin or purification offering just for cultic violations but in Leviticus 4:2 extended the meaning of the term "communal" to embrace the broader area of ethical violations. And Milgrom saw in the discussion of the guilt or reparation offering in Leviticus 5:24b–25 that in matters of expiation, one had to rectify one's relationship with other people before seeking to rectify one's relationship with God.

Diagram of the Documentary Hypothesis

== In critical analysis ==
Scholars who follow the Documentary Hypothesis attribute the parashah to the Priestly source who wrote in the 6th or 5th century BCE.

== Commandments ==
According to Sefer ha-Chinuch, there are 11 positive and 5 negative commandments in the parashah:

- To carry out the procedure of the burnt offering as prescribed in the Torah
- To bring meal offerings as prescribed in the Torah
- Not to burn honey or yeast on the altar
- Not to omit the salt from sacrifices
- To salt all sacrifices
- The Sanhedrin must bring an offering when it rules in error.
- To bring a sin offering for transgression
- Anybody who knows evidence must testify in court.
- To bring an offering of greater or lesser value (if the person is wealthy, an animal; if poor, a bird or meal offering)
- Not to decapitate a fowl brought as a sin offering
- Not to put oil on the meal offerings of wrongdoers
- Not to put frankincense on meal offerings
- One who profaned property must repay what he profaned plus a fifth and bring a sacrifice.
- To bring an offering when uncertain of guilt
- To return the robbed object or its value
- To bring an offering when guilt is certain

== In the liturgy ==
The list of animals from which the Israelites could bring sacrifices in Leviticus 1:2 provides an application of the fourth of the Thirteen Rules for interpreting the Torah in the Baraita of Rabbi Ishmael that many Jews read as part of the readings before the Pesukei d'Zimrah prayer service. The rule provides that when the general precedes the specific, the law applies only to the specific. Leviticus 1:2 says, "you shall bring your offering from the domestic animals, even from the herd or from the flock." Applying the fourth rule teaches that Israelites could bring sacrifices from no domestic animals other than cattle from the herd or sheep or goats from the flock.

During the Torah reading, the gabbai calls for the Kohen to "approach" (קרב, k'rav) to perform the first aliah, or blessing on the Torah reading, recalling the use of the word "approach" (קרב, k'rav) in Leviticus 1:5 to describe the priest's duty to perform the sacrificial service.

Many Jews read excerpts from and allusions to the instructions in the parashah as part of the readings on the offerings after the Sabbath morning blessings. Specifically, Jews read the instructions for the priest's sacrifices in Leviticus 1:11, the prohibition on leavening or honey in the incense in Leviticus 2:11, a discussion of the bulls that are completely burned, in reference to the instructions in Leviticus 4:8–12, and a discussion of the guilt offerings referred to in Leviticus 5:14–26.

== The Weekly Maqam ==
In the Weekly Maqam, Sephardi Jews each week base the songs of the services on the content of that week's parashah. For Parashat Vayikra, Sephardi Jews apply Maqam Rast, the maqam that shows a beginning or an initiation of something, as with this parashah, Jews begin the book of Leviticus.

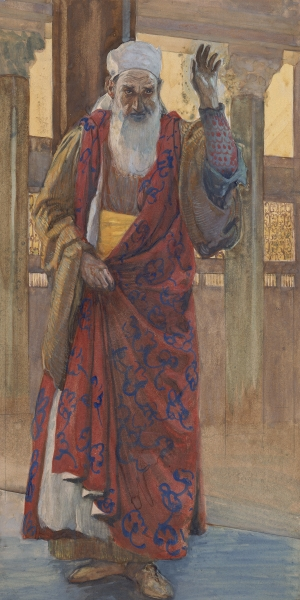
Isaiah (watercolor circa 1896–1902 by James Tissot)

== Haftarah ==
=== Generally ===
The haftarah for the parashah is Isaiah 43:21–44:23.

==== Summary ====
God formed the people of Israel that they might praise God, but they did not call upon God, nor did they bring God their burnt offerings, meal offerings, frankincense, or the fat of their sacrifices. Rather, they burdened God with their sins. God blots out their transgressions for God's own sake. Their first father sinned, and their intercessors transgressed, and so God abandoned the sanctuary and the Israelites to condemnation.

And yet God told the people of Israel not to fear, for God would pour water upon the thirsty land, and God's blessing upon their offspring, and they would spring up like grass. And they would call themselves the Lord's, by the name of Jacob, and by the name of Israel.

God declared that God is the first and the last, and beside God there is no God, no One Who can proclaim what the future will be, no other Rock. Those who fashion graven images shall not profit; they shall be shamed together. The smith makes an ax, and the carpenter forms the figure of a man. He hews down cedars and oaks, and uses the same wood for fuel to warm himself and to make a god to worship. They do not know nor understand that they strive after ashes.

God called on the people of Israel to remember these things, and not forget God who formed them and blotted out their sins. God called on the heaven and earth, mountain and forest to sing, for God had redeemed Israel for God's glory.

==== Connection to the Parashah ====
Both the parashah and the haftarah address sacrifices to God. Both the parashah and the haftarah address burnt offerings ('olah), meal offerings (minchah), frankincense (levonah), and witnesses (ed or eday).

=== On Shabbat Rosh Chodesh ===
When the parashah coincides with Shabbat Rosh Chodesh (as it does in 2029), the haftarah is Isaiah 66:1–24.

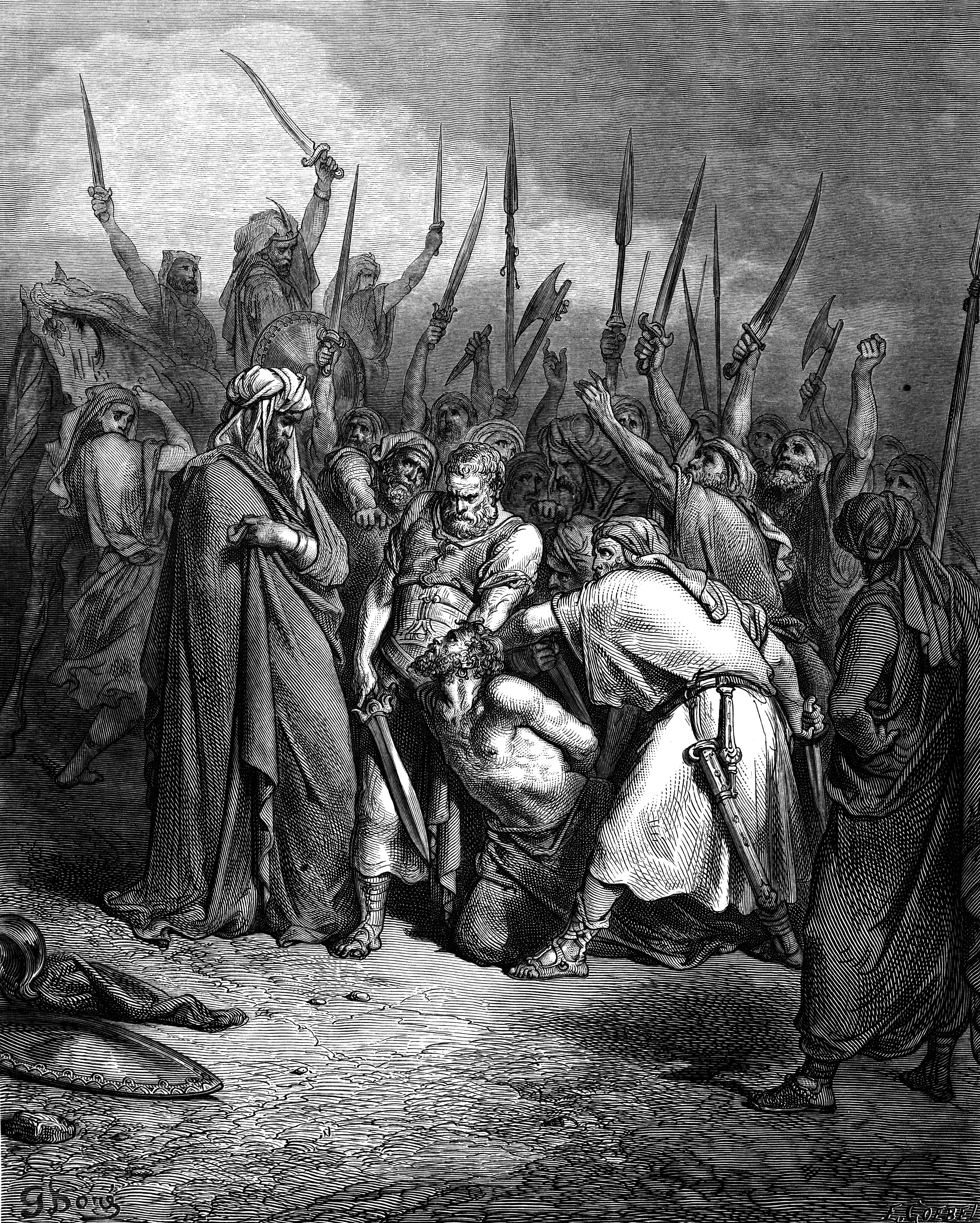
The Death of Agag (illustration by Gustave Doré)

=== On Shabbat Zachor ===
When the parashah coincides with Shabbat Zachor (the special Sabbath immediately preceding Purim—as it does in 2022, 2024, 2027, and 2030), the haftarah is:

- for Ashkenazi Jews: 1 Samuel 15:2–34;
- for Sephardi Jews: 1 Samuel 15:1–34.

==== Connection to the Special Sabbath ====
On Shabbat Zachor, the Sabbath just before Purim, Jews read Deuteronomy 25:17–19, which instructs Jews: "Remember (zachor) what Amalek did" in attacking the Israelites. The haftarah for Shabbat Zachor, 1 Samuel 15:2–34 or 1–34, describes Saul's encounter with Amalek and Saul's and Samuel's treatment of the Amalekite king Agag. Purim, in turn, commemorates the story of Esther and the Jewish people's victory over Haman's plan to kill the Jews, told in the book of Esther. Esther 3:1 identifies Haman as an Agagite, and thus a descendant of Amalek. Numbers 24:7 identifies the Agagites with the Amalekites. Alternatively, a Midrash tells the story that between King Agag's capture by Saul and his killing by Samuel, Agag fathered a child, from whom Haman in turn descended.

== See also ==
- Udhiyyah or Qurbani (sacrifice in Islam)
