= Isaac bar Judah =

4th-century Babylonian rabbi

Rav Isaac bar Rav Judah (Hebrew: רב יצחק בריה דרב יהודה) was a Babylonian rabbi who lived in the 4th century (fourth generation of amoraim).

== Biography ==
His father and principle teacher was Rav Judah ben Ezekiel, who was probably quite old when Isaac was born. In his childhood Isaac already showed signs of unusual intelligence. Isaac and his father debated many halakhic issues together. His father regarded him highly, and would repeat teachings in his son's name, which was considered unusual, since usually the student would quote the teacher and not the reverse. At times he would comment on his father's work.

Isaac did not marry until a late age, because his father Judah did not know how to find a family with sufficiently good lineage, until Ulla visited and taught Judah a method for estimating lineage. Isaac studied also under Rav Huna, as well as under Rabbah bar Nahmani along with Rav Samuel, the son of Rabbah bar bar Hana, and Aha bar Hana.

After their deaths, he became a student of Rami bar Hama. However, he did not like Rami's reliance on logical argumentation rather than reference to tradition, and so he left Rami's lectures, to study under Rav Sheshet who would answer questions based on previous sources.

Along with his brother, Huna bar Judah, he debated halacha with Abaye and Rava.

== His family ==
His granddaughter Homa, the daughter of his son Issi, was termed Isha katlanit ("lethal/deadly woman"), since she married three men, all of whom died: Rehaba of Pumbeditha, Rab Isaac, the son of Rabbah bar bar Hana, and Abaye.
