= Rav Giddel =

Amora sage of Babylon

Rav Giddel (or Gidal or Giddul; Hebrew: רב גידל) was a second generation Amora sage of Babylon and the Land of Israel.

== Biography ==
Rav was his principle teacher. Dozens of times he delivers Rav's teachings in the Talmud - many of which he heard indirectly from his teacher Hiyya bar Joseph, and in rare occasions he also delivers the work of R. Ze'iri.

After the death of Rav, Rav Giddel went to study under Rav Huna. It is told that Rav Huna gave lengthy lectures, and many of his students, among them Rav Giddel, restrained themselves from relieving themselves during the lessons, and became infertile as a result.

Later on he moved to live in the Land of Israel, in the beit midrash of Yochanan bar Nafcha in Tiberias.

Once, when Rav Giddel was in the process of buying a field, R. Abba came and purchased it first. The case came to the attention of R. Isaac Nappaha, who asked R. Abba: "If a poor man is examining a cake and another comes and takes it away from him, what then?", and R. Abba replied: "He is called a wicked man". R. Abba explained to R. Isaac Nappaha that he did not know that Rav Giddel was already eying the field, and now knowing this, he was ready to gift the field to Rav Giddel but not to sell it to him, since selling one's first field is a bad omen. Rav Giddel refused to accept it as a gift, in accordance with the verse: "he that hates gifts shall live", and R. Abba likewise refused to use the field. The field, abandoned by both parties, became known as "The Rabbis’ field"

Rav Giddel was accustomed to go and sit at the gates of the bathing-place (were women would immerse), in order to teach the laws of tevilah. When was asked by the Rabbis: "Is not the Master afraid lest his passion get the better of him?", he replied that he was not afraid since his passion does not control him.
