= Acha Bar Yosef =

Fourth-generation Babylonian scholar of the Talmud

Rav Acha bar Yosef

Personal life
- Born: Babylonia
- Era: Fourth generation Amoraim
- Known for: Fourth generation Babylonian Amora
- Relatives: Uncle of Rav Nachman bar Yitzchak

Religious life
- Religion: Judaism

Senior posting
- Teacher: Rav Huna, Rav Chisda

Rav Acha bar Yosef (Hebrew: אחא בר יוסף) was a fourth-generation Babylonian Amora. He was a close student of Rav Huna and the uncle of Rav Nachman bar Yitzchak.

He was also a student of Rav Chisda, a second- or third-generation Amora.

There is a dispute about whether the Amora named Rav Acha barei deRav Yosef is the same person. According to Seder HaDoroth, they were the same person. However, Aaron Hyman, in "Toledot Tannaim veAmoraim," claims this is a mistake.

Hyman writes that Rav Acha barei deRav Yosef was a student of Rav Ashi, a sixth-generation Amora, and would frequently ask him questions. Rav Ashi praised him for his brilliance.

Aaron Magid agrees with Seder HaDoroth.
