= Abba bar Zabdai =

- אבא בר זבדי

Personal life
- Era: Third century

Religious life
- Religion: Judaism

Jewish leader
- Teacher: Abba Arikha, Rav Huna

Abba (Ba) bar Zabdai (Jewish Babylonian Aramaic: אבא בר זבדי) was a Palestinian amora who flourished in the third century. He studied in Mesopotamia, attending the lectures of Abba Arikha and Rav Huna, and subsequently settled at Tiberias, where he occupied a respected position by the side of Rabbi Ammi and Assi. Mention is made of his custom of saying his prayers in a loud voice (Jerusalem Talmud, Berachot iv.7a). Of his haggadic productions there exists, among others, a sermon for a public fast-day, on Lamentations iii.41 (Yer. Ta'anit, ii.65a), from which the following may be quoted:

Is it, then, possible to 'lift up our heart with our hands'? This verse is intended to advise us 'to put our heart—our bad inclinations—in our hands,' in order to remove them, and then to turn to God in heaven. As long as a man holds an unclean reptile in his hand, he may bathe in all the waters of creation, but he cannot become clean: let him throw it away and he is purified.

== Other quotes ==
Though he may have sinned, he is still an Israelite!

The myrtle that stands amongst the reeds is still a myrtle.

== Jewish Encyclopedia bibliography ==
- Bacher, Ag. Pal. Amor. iii.533, 535;
- Frankel, Mebo, pp. 66a, 67.
