= Adda bar Ahavah =

Two Jewish rabbis and Talmudic scholars

Rav Adda bar Ahavah
- אדא בר אהבה

Personal life
- Born: On the day of Judah haNasi's death Babylonia
- Era: Second generation Amoraim (3rd–4th centuries)
- Known for: Amora of the second generation, Talmudic scholar

Religious life
- Religion: Judaism

Senior posting
- Teacher: Abba Arikha
- Based in: Pumbedita, Babylonia

Adda bar Ahavah or Adda bar Ahabah (רב אדא בר אהבה) is the name of two Jewish rabbis and Talmudic scholars, known as Amoraim, who lived in Lower Mesopotamia, a region known in Jewish texts as "Babylonia".

== The amora of the second generation ==
Rav Adda bar Ahavah was a Talmudist who lived in Babylonia, known as an amora of the second generation (third and fourth centuries), frequently quoted in both the Jerusalem and the Babylonian Talmuds. He is said to have been born on the day that Judah haNasi died. He was a disciple of Abba Arikha, at whose funeral he rent his garments twice in mourning for the great scholar.

At Pumbedita, Rav Adda gathered about him many pupils, whom he taught sometimes in the public thoroughfares. He lived to an old age, and when interrogated on the merits that entitled him to be so favored, he listed his merits as follows:

No one has ever preceded me to the synagogue, nor has any one ever remained in the synagogue after my departure. I never walked as much as four cubits without meditating on the Law, and never thought of its contents at places not scrupulously clean. Nor did I prepare a bed for myself to enjoy regular sleep, nor did I disturb my colleagues by walking to my seat at college among them. I never nicknamed my neighbor nor rejoiced at his fall. Anger against my neighbor never went to bed with me, and I never passed the street near where my debtor lived; and while at home I never betrayed impatience, in order to observe what is said: "I will walk within my house with a perfect heart."

In another talmudic tale, Rav Adda observed on the street a woman named Matun ("Patience") dressed in a manner unbecoming a modest Jewish woman and he ripped off her clothing. Unfortunately for him, the woman was a Samaritan, and thus not subject to Rabbinic jurisdiction, and for the attack on her he was condemned to pay a fine of 400 zuz, and thereupon he exclaimed, "Matun, matun [patience, patience] you were worth 400 zuz to me!"

The following is attributed to Rav Adda: "The man who is conscious of sin and confesses it, but does not turn away from it, is like the man who holds a defiling reptile in his hand; were he to bathe in all the waters of the world, the bath would not restore him to cleanness. Only when he drops it from his hand, and bathes in but forty seahs (about 100 gallons) of water he is clean."

=== Legends as to his sanctity ===
In talmudic legend, Rav Adda's piety was purportedly so highly valued by heaven that no favor asked by him was ever refused. In times of drought, for example, when he pulled off just one shoe (preparatory to offering prayer), an abundance of rain descended; but if he pulled off the other, the world was flooded. Even his teacher, Rav, realized Adda's protective influence. On one occasion when he and Samuel of Nehardea, accompanied by Adda, came to a tottering ruin, and Samuel proposed to avoid it by taking a circuitous route, Rav observed that just then there was no occasion for fear, since Rav Adda, whose merits were very great, was with them; consequently no accident would befall them. Samuel's great colleague Rav Huna also believed in and availed himself of Rav Adda's supposed miraculous influence with heaven. Rav Huna had a lot of wine stored in a building that threatened to collapse. He was anxious to save his property, but there was danger of accident to the laborers. Therefore, he invited Rav Adda into the building, and there engaged him in legal discussions until the task of removing its contents was safely accomplished; hardly had the rabbis vacated the premises when the tottering walls fell.

== The disciple of Rava ==
A second Rav Adda bar Ahavah was also a Jewish Talmudist, a disciple of Rava, addressed by Rava as "my son." In a discussion the elder rabbi once rebuked him as devoid of understanding. Subsequently, he studied under Rav Pappa and waited on Rav Nachman bar Yitzchak.
