= Rabbah bar bar Hana =

Jewish Talmudist who lived in Babylonia

Rabbah bar bar Hana (רבה בר בר חנה) was a Jewish Talmudist who lived in Asoristan, known as an Amora of the third generation.

== Biography ==
He was Hana's grandson and Hiyya's brother. He went to Israel and became a pupil of Johanan bar Nappaha, whose sayings he transmitted.

He does not seem to have enjoyed high regard in Israel, for it was taken as a matter of course that Shimon ben Lakish should not do him the honor of addressing him in public in the Babylonian Talmud, Yoma 9b. After a somewhat prolonged sojourn in Palestine, he returned to Mesopotamia, called Babylonia in Jewish texts, residing both at Pumbedita and at Sura. In Pumbedita, he at first refused to attend the lectures of Judah bar Ezekiel, but he soon became his friend. He consulted him in difficult cases.

According to the Babylonian Talmud, Gittin 16b–17a, Judah and his pupil Rabbah bar Nahmani once visited Rabbah, who was ill, and submitted a halakhic question to him. While they were there, a Zoroastrian priest (Jewish Babylonian Aramaic: חַבְרָא, romanized: ḥaḇrā) suddenly appeared and took the lamp because it was a festival, and Jews were forbidden to have a fire due to its sacredness. He exclaimed: "Merciful One! Let us live either in Your shadow or in the shadow of the descendants of Esau [the Romans]."

The persecutions of the Babylonian Jews by the Sasanian Empire caused Rabbah to resolve to return to Palestine according to the Babylonian Talmud, Pesahim 51a. However, it is nowhere said that he carried out that intention. During his residence at the Sura Academy, he wished to introduce the recitation of the Ten Commandments into the daily prayer but was dissuaded by Rav Chisda. Later, he visited Mahoza and told of the wonderful feats he saw performed there by a juggler according to Bava Batra 73a, b.

== Aggadic teachings ==
Some aggadic sayings by Rabbah bar bar Hana have been preserved. Citing Jeremiah 23:29, he compares the Torah to fire, in that as fire does not start of itself neither does the Law endure in solitary study according to Ta'anit 7a. His interpretations of Proverbs 9:3,14 and Isaiah 28:26 in Sanhedrin 38a, 105a also are noteworthy; he said, "The soul of one righteous person is equal in value to the entire world" in 103b. (Note: Hebrew: נשמה של צדיק אחד כנגד כל העולם)

== Fantastic voyages ==
Rabbah bar bar Hana's stories of his marvelous experiences during his voyages and his journeys through the desert have become famous. These accounts may be divided into two groups.

In the first group, he records his observations, generally beginning with the words "I have seen." Among these are his remarks regarding the identity of the most fertile part of Israel—"the land flowing with milk and honey" in Ketubot 111b–112a; the distance between Jericho and Jerusalem in Yoma 39b; the area of the district in the plains of Moab mentioned in the Stations of the Exodus as the camp of the children of Israel in Yoma 75b; and the castor oil plant cultivated in Israel, or the gourd of Jonah, in Shabbat 21a. Here also belong his accounts of his relations with the Arabs, one of whom once used a term that explained to him the word in Psalms 55:23.

The second group includes his fantastic adventures on the sea and in the desert. One of the most conspicuous figures in these stories is the Arab in Bava Batra 73b, who guided Rabbah and his companions on their journey through the desert. This Arab knew the route so well that he could tell from the odour of the sand when a spring was near. The travelers passed through the desert in which the children of Israel wandered for forty years. The Arab showed Mount Sinai to Rabbah, who heard the voice of God speaking from the mountain and regretting Israel's exile. The Arab likewise pointed out where Israelites had been swallowed by the earth, and from the smoking abyss, Rabbah heard the words, "Moses is truth, and his teachings are truth, but we are liars".

In Bava Batra 73a, he was shown the gigantic bodies of the Israelites who had died in the desert, lying face upward, and where heaven and earth almost touched, so that he could watch the rotation of the celestial spheres around the earth in twenty-four hours. Some Rabbah's stories tell of the immense size of animals he saw. In Bava Batra 73b:5, he says, "Once we were traveling on a ship and we saw a certain fish upon which sand had settled, and grass grew on it. We assumed it was dry land and went up and baked and cooked on the back of the fish, but when its back grew hot it turned over. And were it not for the fact that the ship was close by, we would have drowned." A resemblance to the later voyage of Sinbad the Sailor is obvious.

And Rabba bar bar Ḥana said: I have seen a certain frog [aqruqtā] that was as large as the fort [aqrā] of Hagronya. And how large is the fort of Hagronya? It is as large as sixty houses. A snake came and swallowed the frog. A raven came and swallowed the snake, and flew up and sat in a tree. Come and see how great is the strength of the tree[!]

— Bava Batra 73b:3

Rabbah's stories have called forth an entire literature; in addition to the numerous commentaries on the aggadahic portions of the Talmud that dwell by preference on these accounts, more than twenty essays interpreting and annotating them have appeared in various periodicals.
