= Rav Chisda's daughter =

Learned 3rd-century Jewish woman

Rav Chisda's daughter was the daughter of the second-generation Amora Rav Chisda, and the wife of the third-generation Amora Rami bar Hama. After her husband's death, she married another Amora, Rava. She is mentioned 10 times in the Talmud as "Rav Chisda's daughter" but her own name is unknown.

== Family ==
Rav Chisda's daughter was a descendant of several generations of Torah scholars. Her father was Rav Chisda. Her mother was the daughter of Rav Hanan bar Rava, the son-in-law of Abba Arikha (known as Rav). Despite her marriages, she was always referred to as Rav Chisda's daughter, and never Rava's wife. Even Rava himself called her Rav Chisda's daughter.

== Personality ==
The Talmud describes how as a young child she predicted she would marry her father's two students:

And in what way was prophecy given to children? It was like this incident involving the daughter of Rav Ḥisda, who when she was a child was sitting on her father’s lap while he sat and learned. Rava and Rami bar Ḥama were sitting before him. Rav Ḥisda jokingly said to his daughter: Which of them would you want as a husband? She said: I want both of them. Rava said: And I will be last. And this is what happened; first she married Rami bar Ḥama, and when he died she married Rava.

— Bava Batra 12b

The prophecy of Rav Chisda's daughter was fulfilled, and after the death of Rami bar Hama she married Rava. However, there were about 10 years between Rami bar Hama's death and her marriage to Rava. In the intervening period, she was married to someone else. However, she testified about herself that during those intervening years it was her intent to marry Rava.

Rav Chisda taught his daughters wisdom and upright behavior. The Talmud cites advice that Rav Chisda gave his daughters. "Be modest before your husbands; do not eat bread before your husbands, lest you eat too much and be demeaned in their eyes." And, "Do not eat vegetables at night, as vegetables cause bad breath. Do not eat dates at night and do not drink beer at night, as these loosen the bowels. And do not relieve yourself in the place where your husbands relieve themselves, so that they will not be revolted by you." The Talmud also cites halakha that she taught Rava in the name of her father.

The Talmud relates that she was an expert in the laws of shechita and nikkur.

Rava trusted his wife, and even relied on her testimony more than the testimony of Rav Pappa.

== Popular culture ==
Maggie Anton wrote a two-volume series of books entitled "Rav Chisda's Daughter." The first volume, "Apprentice," was published in 2012, and the second, "Enchantress" in 2014.
