= Hiyya bar Joseph =

3rd-century Babylonian rabbi

Rav Hiyya bar Joseph (or Rav Hiyya bar Yosef; Hebrew: רבי חייא בר יוסף) was a Babylonian rabbi of the 3rd century (second generation of amoraim).

== Biography ==
In Babylonia, he lived in a place called Sikara on the shore of the Tigris river, near Mahuza, and had served as the city sage instituting measures.

He mainly studied under Rav and frequently quotes his teachings. He would sometimes go to Samuel's school and submit secondhand reports of Rav, and get Samuel's response. He was also a student of Samuel (probably after the death of Rav, like some other of Rav's students), and addressed him with questions, and would sometimes dispute him.

Later on he made Aliyah to the Land of Israel. Here he made his livelihood from salt trading. Little is known about his family, except that after immigrating to the Land of Israel alone, he sent someone to bring his wife.

Upon arrival to the Land of Israel he studied with R. Yochanan bar Nafcha and Shimon ben Lakish, and submitted to them rulings by Rav. Even with Yochanan bar Nafcha he disputed on various matters. He also studied under R. Hiyya bar Abba. The Talmud also mentions that Hiyya bar Joseph is addressing Yochanan bar Nafcha with questions, however, he was probably not considered Yochanan's pupil: in a dispute among them, Hiyya bar Joseph is mentioned first, and various doubts on halachic matters were brought before both of them as one. At times, Hiyya bar Joseph also delivers statements in the name of Hoshaiah Rabbah.

== Pupils ==
Rav Giddel studied under him when he was still in Babylonia, and delivers statements in his name that are secondhand statements made by Rav. The rabbis of Caesarea, the students of Caesarean academy, also cite laws in his name.
