= Zeiri =

Babylonian Jewish Talmudist

Zeiri was a rabbi who lived in the third century (second generation of amoraim).

== Biography ==
He was born in Babylonia, and later sojourned for a while in Alexandria, before moving to Syria Palaestina, where he became a pupil of Rabbi Johanan. During his sojourn in Alexandria he purchased a mule which, when he led it to water, was transformed into a bridge-board, the water having lifted the spell which rested on the animal. He was refunded the purchase-money, and advised to apply the water-test to everything he purchased, in order to ascertain whether it had been charmed. When Rabbi Eleazar arrived in the Holy Land, he sought information from Zeiri concerning men known in ancient traditions. He was praised by Rabbah as an exegete of the Mishnah. He was proffered the daughter of Rabbi Johanan for a wife, but refused because he was from Babylonia, and she from the land of Israel.

== Teachings ==
In the name of Hanina bar Hama, he transmitted the maxim that he who in the presence of a teacher ventures to decide a legal question, is a trespasser. He also transmitted a saying by Hanina to the effect that the Messiah would not arrive until all the arrogant ones had disappeared.

Several sages transmitted teachings in his name: Rav Chisda, Rabbi Judah, Rabbi Joseph, Rabbi Nachman, and Rabbah.
