= Rami bar Hama =

Rami bar Hama (Hebrew: רמי בר חמא; Rami = R. Ami) was a Babylonian amora of the third generation.

== Biography ==
He was a pupil of Rav Chisda, and a fellow student of Rava, who was somewhat his junior.

He frequently addressed questions to Rav Chisda. Rav Chisda once asked him a question to which Rami found an answer in a mishnah; R. Chisda thereupon rewarded him by rendering him a personal service. He was also associated with R. Naḥman, whom he often attempted to refute. Rami married Rav Chisda's daughter; when he died, at an early age, his colleague Rava married his widow. Rava declared that his premature death was a punishment for having affronted Manasseh b. Taḥlifa, a student of the Law, by treating him as an ignoramus.

Rami bar Hama was possessed of rare mental acuteness, but Rava asserted that his unusual acumen led him to reach his conclusions too hastily. He attempted to decide questions independently, and would not always search for a mishnah or baraita to support an opinion. His pupil Isaac b. Judah left him, therefore, to study under R. Sheshet, saying that although a decision might apparently be based on correct reasoning, it must be ignored if a mishnah or a baraita could be found that contradicted it; but a decision rendered in agreement with a mishnah or a baraita does not become invalid, even where another mishnah or baraita can be cited in opposition to it. Rami bar Hama's daughter may have married Rav Ashi.

His daughter's son was Amemar.
