= Rav Assi =

Rabbi of Babylonia

Rav Assi (Hebrew: רב אסי), or Assi (I), was a rabbi of Babylonia, of the first generation of the amoraim.

== Identification ==
Rav Assi should not be confused with the Amora sage of the land of Israel, Rabbi Assi, who was of the third generation of the Amora era, and is recorded many times both in the Babylon and the Jerusalem Talmud.

In the Jerusalem Talmud Rav Assi is recorded merely as Issi or Assa, without the title "Rav" or "Rabbi", much like other amoraim of the first generation.

== Biography ==
He was a Kohen. He originated from Hutzal, located near Nehardea in Babylonia. He was a "Fellow Student" of Rav. He was a colleague of Rav, Samuel of Nehardea and Rav Kahana I. The Talmud records him disagreeing with Rav many times. Rav and Samuel would honor Rav Assi by not entering into a Brit milah event before Rav Assi did.

He was a teacher of R. Judah ben Ezekiel.

He died shortly after Rav died.

== Quotes ==
- The son of David (i.e. the Messiah) shall not come until all the souls have been depleted from the body. (i.e. until all persons who were meant to be born are born)
