= Rav Chisda =

Babylonian Jewish Talmudist

Rav Ḥisda
- Born: c. 217 CE; Kafri, Parthian Empire
- Died: c. 309 CE
- Burial place: Jamnia, Upper Galilee; 32°59′29″N 35°31′01″E
- Occupations: Rabbi, Talmudist
- Known for: Contributions to Talmudic law and aggadah
- Notable work: Casuistic teachings, halakhot, ethical teachings

Rav Ḥisda (Hebrew: רב חסדא) was a Jewish Talmudist who lived in Kafri, Asoristan in Lower Mesopotamia near what is now the city of Najaf, Iraq. He was an amora of the third generation (died c. 309 CE at the age of ninety-two), and is mentioned frequently in the Talmud.

== Biography ==
Rav Ḥisda descended from a priestly family. He studied under Abba Arikha "Rav", who was his principal teacher and after the latter's death he attended the lectures of Rav Huna, a companion of the same age. The pair were called "the Hasidim of Babylon". Rav Ḥisda was also among those called tzadikim, those who could bring down rain by their prayers.

At first, he was so poor that he abstained from vegetables because they increased his appetite, and when he walked in thorny places he raised his garments, saying: "The breaches in my legs will heal of themselves but the breaches in my garments will not". At the age of sixteen he married the daughter of Hanan bar Rava and together they had seven or more sons and two daughters. Later, as a brewer, he became very wealthy. Two of his pupils, Rami bar Hama and later Rava, married Rav Chisda's daughter.

Rav Ḥisda was a great casuist, his acute mind greatly enhanced the fame of Rav Huna's academy in Sura, but his very acuteness indirectly caused a rupture between himself and Rav Huna. The separation was brought about by a question from Rav Ḥisda as to the obligations of a disciple toward a master to whom he is indispensable. Rav Huna saw the point and said, "Ḥisda, I do not need you; it is you that needs me!". Forty years passed before they became reconciled. Rav Ḥisda nevertheless held Rav Huna in great esteem, and although he had established a school built at his own expense in Mata Mehasya four years before Rav Huna's death, he never published any decision during Rav Huna's lifetime. Rav Huna came to recognize Rav Ḥisda's merit later and recommended his son, Rabbah bar Rav Huna, to attend his lectures.

Rav Ḥisda also presided over Sura for ten years following the death of Judah bar Ezekiel, or following the death of Rav Huna, according to Abraham ibn Daud. He always preserved great respect for the memory of Abba Arikha, whom he referred to as "our great teacher, may God aid him". Once, holding up the gifts which are given to the kohenim, he declared that he would give them to the man who could cite a previously unknown halakha in the name of Abba Arikha. After Rav Ḥisda's death, no one succeeded him as the rosh mesivta of Sura and the central Talmudic authority passed to Rabbah in Pumbedita.

== Teachings ==
Rav Ḥisda's halakhot are frequent throughout the Babylonian Talmud, some being given on the authority of his pupils. His principal opponent was Sheshet. Besides deducing his halakhot in a casuistic way, Rav Ḥisda was peculiar in that he derived his halakhot less from the Torah than from other parts of the Bible.

Rav Ḥisda was also an authority in aggadah, and employed special assistants to lecture in that department. Many ethical teachings by him have been preserved for students, such as: "Forbearance on the part of a father toward his child may be permitted, but not forbearance on the part of a master toward his disciple" and "He who opposes his master is as though he opposed the Shekhinah". It was said that the Angel of Death, not being able to approach Rav Ḥisda because he never ceased from studying, cleft the trunk of a cedar-tree. Terrified by the noise, Rav Ḥisda interrupted his studies, whereupon the angel took his soul.

Rav Chisda's remains are said to have been brought to Jamnia in Upper Galilee for burial.

== See also ==
- Beer in Israel
