= Rabbah bar Rav Huna =

Personal life
- Died: 322
- Parent: Rav Huna (father)
- Known for: Head of the Academy of Sura, amora of the third generation

Religious life
- Religion: Judaism

Senior posting
- Teacher: Rav Chisda

Rabbah bar Rav Huna was a Jewish Talmudist who lived in Babylonia, known as an amora of the third generation (died 322). He was the son of Rav Huna, the head of the Academy of Sura.

== In the Talmudic Academy ==
He was a man of true piety and genuine modesty, and was urged by his father to attend Rav Chisda's lectures diligently and to profit by his acumen. At first, however, Rabbah held aloof because matters were discussed which did not appeal to his earnest nature. But later he became closely associated with Rav Chisda, and was appointed judge under him; subsequently the two discussed aggadic subjects together.

After the death of Rav Chisda, Rabbah became the head of the Academy of Sura, though he apparently held this position without the approval of the exilarch. His general relations with the exilarchate were by no means friendly, and he declared himself independent of its authority.

== Teachings ==
A number of his halakhic and aggadic teachings appear in the Talmud, including:

- He who is insolent must be considered a transgressor.
- When one falls into a rage, he loses the respect of God.
- He who possesses learning [in the Torah], but is without the fear of God, is like a steward to whom have been given the keys of the inner storehouses but not the outer keys; he cannot gain access to the storehouses".
