= Sheshet =

Babylonian amora

Rav Sheshet (Hebrew: רב ששת) was an amora of the third generation of the Talmudic academies in Babylonia (then Asoristan, now Lower Mesopotamia, Iraq). His name is sometimes read Shishat or Bar Shishat.

== Biography ==
He was a colleague of Rav Nachman, with whom he had frequent arguments concerning questions of halakha. His teacher's name is not definitively known, but Rav Sheshet was an auditor at Rav Huna's lectures. It is certain that he was not a pupil of Abba Arikha (Rav), since certain sayings of his displeased him, he criticized them with a disrespect which he would not have shown toward his own teacher, saying: "he must have spoken thus when he was asleep".

Sheshet lived first at Nehardea, where he used to study in the Great Synagogue of Baghdad, going thence to Mahuza, and later to Shilhe, where he founded an academy. He was feeble in body, but nevertheless had an iron will and great energy.

== His learning ==
Although he was blind, he was compensated by a very retentive memory, for he knew by heart the entire body of tannaitic tradition, as well as its amoraic interpretations. He hired a scholar ("tanna") acquainted with the mishnah and the baraita to read them to him.

Rav Ḥisda, when he met Sheshet, used to tremble at the wealth of baraitot and maxims which Sheshet quoted. Sheshet also transmitted many sayings of the older tannaim, especially of Eleazar ben Azariah. In his teaching he always took tradition as his basis, and for every question laid before him for decision he sought a mishnah or baraita from which he might deduce the solution of the problem, his extensive knowledge of these branches of literature always enabling him to find the passage he required. His usual answer to a question was: "We have learned it in the Mishnah or in a baraita". When he had presented some sentence to the attention of his pupils, he used to ask immediately, "Whence have I this?" and would then add a mishnah or a baraita from which he had derived the decision in question.

In addition to his learning and his knowledge of tradition, Sheshet possessed much acuteness, and knew how to deduce conclusions from the teachings of tradition. Thus, in connection with his application of Ecclesiastes 7:11, Rami bar Hama said of him: "It is good when one possesses a keen understanding in addition to the inheritance of tradition". However, he was less subtle than his colleague Rav Ḥisda, and he appears to have been averse in general to the casuistry in vogue in the academy of Pumbedita. When he heard any one make a quibbling objection he used to observe sarcastically: "Are you not from Pumbedita, where they draw an elephant through the eye of a needle?". Sheshet was on friendly terms with Rav Chisda, and the pair respected each other highly, traveled in company, and were together at the exilarch's.

== His aggadah ==
Sheshet devoted much time to Biblical exegesis, and whenever he recapitulated his studies, as was his custom at the end of every thirty days, he used to say: "Rejoice, my soul! rejoice, my soul! For your sake have I read the Holy Scriptures; and for your sake have I studied the Mishnah and the baraitot". On the other hand, he took comparatively little interest in aggadah, and he himself acknowledged his shortcoming in this respect, saying: "I cannot dispute with Hana on aggadah". Some of his aggadic interpretations of Biblical passages, referring for the most part to Torah study, have been preserved. Thus, he interpreted Proverbs 11:25 as implying that whoever teaches in this world will have the good fortune to teach in the world to come also; and explained Proverbs 3:16 as meaning that whosoever studies in the right manner receives as his reward length of days in addition to riches and honor, but that he who studies in a fashion not altogether unimpeachable receives riches and honor without length of days. He frequently elucidated Biblical passages by the application of well-known proverbs.

Sheshet, who (as stated above) was blind, once mingled with a crowd waiting to see the entry of the king. A heretic (probably an adherent of Manicheism, against which Sheshet polemized) taunted him with the remark that he certainly would not be able to see the king. Sheshet, however, put the heretic to shame by recognizing, despite his blindness, when the instant of the king's appearance was at hand. When the heretic, in his astonishment, asked Sheshet how he knew it, he received the answer: "The earthly kingdom resembles the heavenly; God's appearance, however, is announced in I Kings 19:12-13 by a deep silence".
