= Kafri =

Kafri كفري
- Village
- Location within Iran
- Coordinates: 29°30′05″N 52°29′09″E
- Country: Iran
- Province: Fars
- County: Shiraz
- Bakhsh: Central
- Rural District: Qarah Bagh

Population (2006)
  - Total: 1,636
- Time zone: UTC+3:30 (IRST)
  - Summer (DST): UTC+4:30 (IRDT)

Kafri (Persian: كفري, also Romanized as Kafrī) is a village in Qarah Bagh Rural District, in the Central District of Shiraz County, Fars province, Iran. At the 2006 census, its population was 1,636, in 390 families.
