= Judah bar Ezekiel =

Babylonian rabbi and amora (220–299)

- יהודה בן יחזקאל
- Title: Rabbi, Amora

Personal life
- Born: 220 CE
- Died: 299 CE
- Children: Isaac, Judah
- Known for: Founder of the Pumbedita Academy

Religious life
- Religion: Judaism

Senior posting
- Teacher: Rav, Samuel of Nehardea

Judah bar Ezekiel (220–299 CE) (Hebrew: יהודה בן יחזקאל) often known as Rav Yehudah, was a Babylonian amora of the 2nd generation.

== Biography ==
Judah was the most prominent disciple of Rav, in whose house he often stayed, and whose son Hiyya b. Rav was his pupil. After Rav's death Judah went to Samuel of Nehardea, who esteemed him highly and called him "Shinena" (= "sharpwitted", or "he with the long teeth"). He remained with Samuel until he founded a school of his own at Pumbedita. He died there in 299 CE.

Judah was celebrated for his piety, and it is related that whenever he ordained a fast in time of drought rain fell.

His sons Isaac and Judah also became known as rabbis.

== Teachings ==
Judah possessed such great zeal for learning and such tireless energy that he even omitted daily prayer in order to secure more time for study, and prayed but once in thirty days. This diligence, together with a remarkably retentive memory, made it possible for him to collect and transmit the greater part of Rav's, as well as many of Samuel's, sayings; the Talmud contains about 400 aggadic and halakhic sayings by Rav, and many by Samuel, all recorded by Judah b. Ezekiel, while a number of other sayings of Rav's that occur in the Talmud without the name of the transmitter likewise were handed down by Judah.

In recording the words of his teachers, Judah used extreme care, and frequently stated explicitly that his authority for a given saying was uncertain, and that his informant did not know positively whether it was Rav's or Samuel's. His own memory, however, never failed him, and the traditions recorded by him are reliable. When his brother Rami says, in one place, that a certain sentence of Rav's, quoted by Judah, should be disregarded, he does not question the accuracy of Judah's citation, but implies that Rav had afterward abandoned the opinion quoted by Judah, and had, in a statement which the latter had not heard, adopted an opposite view.

=== New method of dialectics ===
In the school which Judah built up at Pumbedita, he introduced a new and original method of instruction: by emphasizing the need of an exact differentiation between, and a critical examination of, the subjects treated, he became the founder of Talmudic dialectics. His method of instruction, however, did not please some of his older pupils, and they left him; among these was Ze'era, who went to Palestine despite Judah's declaration that no man should leave Babylonia for that country. But the new method was acceptable to most of his disciples, and was especially attractive to the young, so that the school at Pumbedita steadily increased in importance and popularity. After the death of Rav Huna, head of the Academy of Sura, most of his pupils went to Pumbedita, which, until the death of Judah, remained the only seat of Talmudic learning. Although Judah devoted himself chiefly to dialectics, he did not fail to interpret the mishnayot, to explain peculiar words in them, or to determine the correct reading where several were given.

Judah gave little attention to aggadah, and what work he did in that field was almost entirely lexicographical. In his daily conversation he took pains to acquire the habit of exact and appropriate expression, for which his contemporary Naḥman b. Jacob praised him.

A lover of nature, Judah was a close observer of the animal and plant life around him. "When in the springtime you see Nature in her beauty, you shall thank God that He has formed such beautiful creatures and plants for the good of mankind". Several of his explanations of natural phenomena have been preserved, as well as etymologies of the names of animals and descriptions of their characteristics.

According to him, piety consists chiefly in fulfilling one's obligations to one's fellow creatures and in observing the laws of "meum et tuum" (Latin: "mine and thine", referring to the respect of private property):

One who wishes to be pious should observe the principles of Nezikin (Damages)

It was probably for this reason that he applied himself chiefly to the Mishnaic treatise Neziḳin.
