= Rav Huna =

3rd century Babylonian Talmudist and Exilarch

- רב הונא
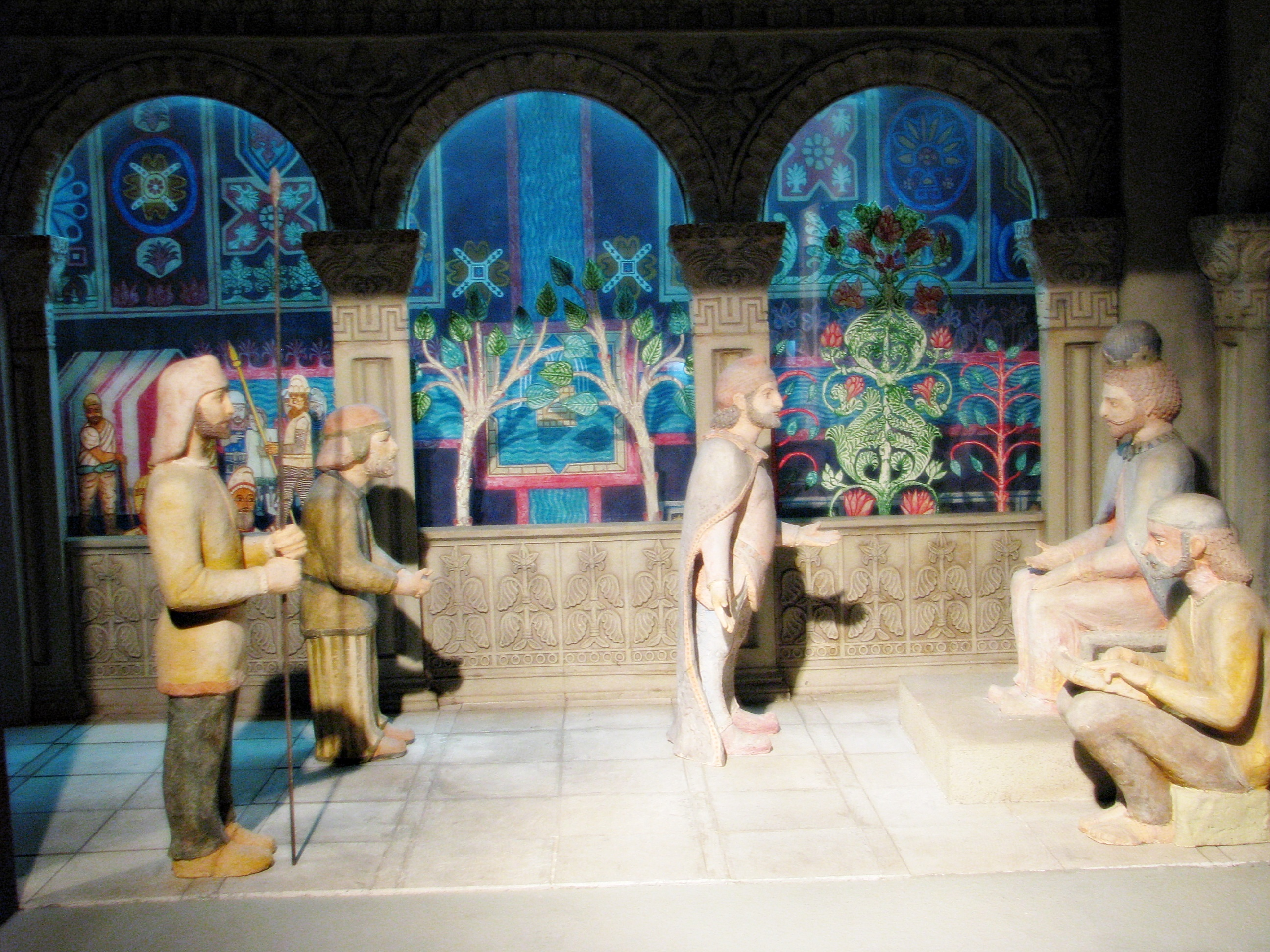
- An exhibit depicting Huna at the Beit Hatefutsot

Personal life
- Born: 216 CE
- Died: 296–297 CE
- Era: Second generation of amoraim

Religious life
- Religion: Judaism

Jewish leader
- Teacher: Rav
- Disciples: Rav Chisda, Abba bar Zavda, Rav Giddel, R. Helbo, R. Sheshet, Yiṣḥaq b. Ḥanina, Rabbah

Rav Huna (Hebrew: רב הונא) was a Jewish Talmudist and Exilarch who lived in Babylonia, known as an amora of the second generation and head of the Academy of Sura; he was born about 216 CE (212 CE according to Gratz) and died in 296–297 CE (608 of the Seleucidan era) or in 290 CE.

== Biography ==
He lived in a town, identified by Wiesener with Tikrit. He was the principal pupil of Rav, under whom he acquired so much learning that one of Rava's three wishes was to possess Rav Huna's wisdom. He was also styled "one of the Babylonian Hasidim," on account of his great piety. The esteem in which he was held was so great that, though not of a priestly family, he read from the Torah on Shabbat and holy days the first passage, which is usually read by a Kohen (priest). Rav Ammi and Rav Assi, honored Israeli Kohanim, considered Huna as their superior.

Although Rav Huna was related to the family of the exilarch he was so poor at the beginning of his career that in order to buy wine to consecrate the Shabbat he had to pawn his girdle. But Rav blessed him with riches, and Rav Huna displayed great wealth at the wedding of his son Raba bar Rav Huna. He owned numerous flocks of sheep, which were under the special care of his wife, Hobah, and he traveled in a gilded litter. Rav Huna was very generous. When the houses of the poor people were thrown down by storms he rebuilt them; at meal-times the doors of his house would be left open, while his servants would call out: "He who is hungry, let him come and eat".

After Rav's death, Huna lectured in his stead in the Academy of Sura, but he was not appointed head until after the death of Rav's companion, Samuel (c. 256). It was under Rav Huna that the Academy of Sura, which until then was called sidra, acquired the designation of mesivta (yeshivah), with Rav Huna being the first "Resh Mesivta" (rosh yeshivah). Under Huna the academy increased considerably in importance, and students flocked to it from all directions; during his presidency their number reached 800, all supported by himself. Their instant lecturers ("amora'e") were occupied in teaching them. When his pupils, after the lesson, shook their garments they raised so great a cloud of dust that when the Palestinian sky was overcast it was said, "Huna's pupils in Babylon have risen from their lesson". Under Rav Huna, Palestine lost its ascendency over Babylonia; and on certain occasions he declared the schools of the two countries to be equal. In Babylonia, during his lifetime, the Sura academy held the supremacy. He presided over it for forty years, when he died suddenly, more than eighty years of age. His remains were brought to Israel and buried by the side of Hiyya the Great.

Rav Huna's principal pupil was Rav Chisda, who had previously been his companion under Rav. Other pupils of his whose names are given were: Abba bar Zavda, Rav Giddel, R. Helbo, R. Sheshet, Yiṣḥaq b. Ḥanina, and Huna's own son, Rabbah.

=== Character traits ===
Rav Huna was known to be very tolerant as well as very modest. He was not ashamed, before he was rich, to cultivate his field himself, nor to return home in the evening with his spade on his shoulder. When two contending parties requested him to judge between them, he said to them: "Give me a man to cultivate my field and I will be your judge". He patiently bore Rav's hard words, because the latter was his teacher, but he showed on several occasions that a scholar must not humiliate himself in presence of an inferior. Some describe his discourses as being so long that they caused infertility, through his students having to wait to relieve themselves.

== Teachings ==
=== Halacha ===
He transmitted many of Rav's halakhot, sometimes without mentioning Rav's name. His own halakhot are numerous in the Babylonian Talmud, and although some of his decisions were contrary to Rav's, he declared Rav to be the supreme authority in religious law. Rav Huna's deductions were sometimes casuistical; he interpreted the text verbatim even where the context seems to prohibit such an interpretation. According to Rav Huna, the halakhah transmitted in the Mishnah and Baraita is not always to be taken as decisive. He had some knowledge of medicine and natural history and used his knowledge in many of his halakhic decisions. He also interpreted many of the difficult words met with in the Mishnah and Baraita.

=== Aggadah ===
Rav Huna was equally distinguished as an aggadist, and his aggadot were known in the Land of Israel, to where they were carried by some of his pupils, Rav Zeira among them. His interpretation of Proverbs 14:23, transmitted by Rav Zeira, is styled "the pearl". Many of his aggadot, showing his skill in Biblical exegesis, are found in the Babylonian Talmud, some in the name of Rav, some in his own. He took special pains to reconcile apparently conflicting passages, as, for instance, 2 Samuel 7:10 and 1 Chronicles 17:9. He attempted to solve the problem of theodicy, inferring from Isaiah 53:10 that God chastens those whom He loves.

=== Quotes ===
- "He who occupies himself with the study of the Law alone is as one who has no God".
- "When leaving the synagogue, one must not take long steps".
- "He who recites his prayer behind the synagogue is called impious or rasha.
- "He who is accustomed to honor Shabbat with light will have children who are scholars; he who observes the injunction of mezuzah will have a beautiful house; he who observes the rule as to the tzitzit will have fine clothes; he who consecrates the Shabbat and the holy days as commanded will have many skins filled with wine".
- "Saul fell once, and he was dismissed. David twice, yet he stayed on".
- "[Demons] are more numerous than we are and they surround us like the ridge round a field. Every one among us has a thousand on his left hand and ten thousand on his right hand".

Regnal titles
Preceded by Nathan Ukban I	7th Babylonian Exilarch ?-297	Succeeded by Nathan Ukban II
