= Abba Arikha =

Jewish Babylonian scholar (175–247)

- אַבָּא אריכא
- Born: Abba bar Aybo; 175; Kafri, Asoristan, Sasanian Empire (present-day Iran)
- Died: 247; Sura, Asoristan, Sasanian Empire (present-day Iraq)
- Occupation: Rabbi
- Known for: Scholarship (amoraim) for Talmudic academies in Babylonia

Rav Abba bar Aybo (Aramaic: רַב אַבָּא בַּר אִיבּוֹ; 175–247 CE), commonly known as Abba Arikha (אַבָּא אריכא) or simply as Rav (רַב), was a Jewish amora of the 3rd century. He was born and lived in Kafri, Asoristan, in the Sasanian Empire.

In Sura, Arikha established the systematic study of the rabbinic traditions, which, using the Mishnah as a foundational text, led to the compilation of the Talmud. With him began the long period of ascendancy of the prestigious Talmudic academies in Babylonia around the year 220. In the Talmud, he is frequently associated with Samuel of Nehardea, a fellow amora with whom he debated many issues.

== Biography ==
His surname, Arikha (English: the Tall), he owed to his height, which exceeded that of his contemporaries. Others, reading Arekha, consider it an honorary title, like "Lecturer". In the traditional literature, he is referred to almost exclusively as Rav, "the Master" (both by contemporaries and latter generations), just as his teacher, Judah ha-Nasi, was known simply as Rabbi. He is called Rabbi Abba only in the tannaitic literature, wherein a number of his sayings are preserved. He occupies a middle position between the Tannaim and the Amoraim and is accorded the right—rarely conceded to one who is only an amora—of disputing the opinion of a tanna.

Rav was a descendant of a distinguished Babylonian family that claimed to trace its origin to Shimei, brother of King David. His father, Aibo, was a brother of Hiyya the Great who lived in Palestine, and was a highly esteemed scholar in the collegiate circle of the patriarch Judah ha-Nasi. From his associations in his uncle's house and later as his uncle's disciple and as a member of the academy at Sepphoris, Rav acquired such knowledge of the tradition to make him its foremost exponent in Babylonia. While Judah ha-Nasi was still living, Rav, having been ordained as a teacher with certain restrictions, returned to Asoristan, referred to as "Babylonia" in Jewish writings, where he at once began a career that was destined to mark an epoch in the development of Babylonian Judaism.

In the annals of the Babylonian schools, the year of his arrival is recorded as the starting point in the chronology of the Talmudic age. It was the 530th year of the Seleucid era and the 219th year of the Common Era. For the scene of his activity, Rav first chose Nehardea, where the exilarch appointed him agoranomos (market-master), and Rav Shela made him lecturer (amora) of his college. Then he moved to Sura, on the Euphrates, where he established a school of his own, which soon became the intellectual center of the Babylonian Jews. As a renowned teacher of the Law and with hosts of disciples from all sections of the Jewish world, Rav lived and worked in Sura until his death. Samuel of Nehardea, another disciple of Judah ha-Nasi, at the same time brought to the academy at Nehardea a high degree of prosperity; in fact, it was at the school of Rav that Jewish learning in Babylonia found its permanent home and center. Rav's activity made Babylonia independent of Palestine and gave it that predominant position it was destined to occupy for several centuries.

Little is known of Rav's personal life. That he was rich seems probable, for he appears to have occupied himself for a time with commerce and afterward with agriculture. He is referred to as the son of noblemen, but it is not clear if this is an affectionate term or a true description of his status. Rashi tells us that he is described as the son of great men. He was highly respected by the Gentiles as well as by the Jews of Babylonia, as shown by the friendship that existed between him and the last Parthian, Artabanus IV. He was deeply affected by the death of Artaban in 226 and the downfall of the Parthian rulers and does not appear to have sought the friendship of Ardashir I, founder of the Sasanian Empire, although Samuel of Nehardea probably did so.

Rav became closely related to the exilarch's family through the marriage of one of his daughters. Her sons, Mar Ukban and Nehemiah, were considered types of the highest aristocracy. Rav had many sons, several of whom are mentioned in the Talmud, the most distinguished being the eldest, Chiyya. Chiyya did not, however, succeed his father as head of the academy: this post fell to Rav's disciple Rav Huna. Two of his grandsons occupied the office of exilarch in succession.

Rav died at an advanced age, deeply mourned by numerous disciples and the entire Babylonian Jewry, which he had raised from comparative insignificance to the leading position in Judaism.

== Legacy ==
The method of treatment of the traditional material to which the Talmud owes its origin was established in Babylonia by Rav. That method takes the Mishnah of Judah haNasi as a text or foundation, adding to it the other tannaitic traditions, and deriving from all of them the theoretical explanations and practical applications of the religious Law. The legal and ritual opinions recorded in Rav's name and his disputes with Samuel constitute the main body of the Babylonian Talmud. His numerous disciples—some of whom were very influential and who, for the most part, were also disciples of Samuel—amplified and, in their capacity as instructors and by their discussions, continued the work of Rav. In the Babylonian schools, Rav was rightly referred to as "our great master." Rav also exercised a great influence for good upon the moral and religious conditions of his native land, not only indirectly through his disciples, but directly by reason of the strictness with which he repressed abuses in matters of marriage and divorce, and denounced ignorance and negligence in matters of ritual observance.

== Teachings ==
He gave special attention to the liturgy of the synagogue. The Aleinu prayer first appeared in the manuscript of the Rosh Hashana liturgy by Rav. He included it in the Rosh Hashana mussaf service as a prologue to the Kingship portion of the Amidah. For that reason some attribute to Rav the authorship, or at least the revising, of Aleinu. In this noble prayer are evinced profound religious feeling and exalted thought, as well as ability to use the Hebrew language in a natural, expressive, and classical manner. He also composed the prayer recited on Shabbat before the start of a new month, Birkat ha-Hodesh.

The many homiletic and ethical sayings recorded of him show similar ability. The greatest aggadist among Babylonian Amoraim, he is the only one of them whose aggadic utterances approach in number and contents those of the Palestinian haggadists. The Jerusalem Talmud has preserved a large number of his halakhic and aggadic utterances; and the Palestinian Midrashim also contain many of his aggadot. Rav delivered homiletic discourses, both in the beit midrash and in the synagogues. He especially loved to discuss in his homilies the events and personages of Biblical history; and many beautiful and genuinely poetic embellishments of the Biblical record, which have become common possession of the aggadah, are his creations. His aggadah is particularly rich in thoughts concerning the moral life and the relations of human beings to one another. A few of these teachings may be quoted here:

- "The commandments of the Torah were only given to purify men's morals"
- "Whatever may not properly be done in public is forbidden even in the most secret chamber"
- "In the future, a person will give a judgement and accounting over everything that his eye saw and he did not eat."
- "Whoever lacks pity for his fellow man is no child of Abraham"
- "Better to cast oneself into a fiery furnace than to publicly shame one's fellow man."
- "One should never betroth himself to a woman without having seen her; one might subsequently discover in her a blemish because of which one might loathe her and thus transgress the commandment: 'Thou shalt love thy neighbor as thyself'"
- "A father should never prefer one child above another; the example of Joseph shows what evil consequences may result."
- "While the dates are still in the borders of your skirt, run off with them to the distillery!" [Meaning, before one wastes what he has, let him convert it into something more productive]
- "Receive the payment. Deliver the goods!" [i.e. do not sell on credit]
- "[Better to come] under the displeasure of Ishmael (i.e. the Arabs) than [the displeasure of] Rome; [better to come] under the displeasure of Rome than [the displeasure of] a Persian; [better to come] under the displeasure of a Persian than [the displeasure of] a disciple of the Sages; [better to come] under the displeasure of a disciple of the Sages than [the displeasure of] an orphan and widow."
- "A man ought always to occupy himself in the words of the Law, and in the commandments, even if it were not for their own sake. For eventually he will do it for their own sake"
- "A man ought always to look about in search of a [good] city whose settlement is only of late, considering that since its settlement is [relatively] new, its iniquities are also few."
- "A disciple of the Sages ought to have in him one-eighth of one-eighth of pride, [and no more]."

Rav loved the Book of Ecclesiasticus (Sirach), and warned his disciple Hamnuna Saba against unjustifiable asceticism by quoting its advice that considering the transitoriness of human life, one should not despise the good things of this world.

To the celestial joys of the future he was accustomed to refer in the following poetic words:

Nothing on earth compares with the future life. In the world to come there shall be neither eating nor drinking, neither trading nor toil, neither hatred nor envy; but the righteous shall sit with crowns upon their heads, and rejoice in the radiance of the Divine Presence.

Rav also devoted much attention to mystical and transcendental speculations regarding Maaseh Bereshit, Maaseh Merkabah, and the Divine Name. Many of his important utterances testify to his tendency in this direction.
