= Berakhot =

Berakhot, Brachot, or Brochos may refer to:

- Bracha, a Jewish benediction
  - Any one of the various benedictions; see List of Jewish prayers and blessings
- Berakhot (tractate), of the Talmud, which discusses benedictions, among other topics

== See also ==
- V'Zot HaBerachah, the last of the weekly Torah portions
