= Hamnuna Saba =

Babylonian rabbi

Rav Hamnuna Saba (Hamnuna the Elder) was a Babylonian rabbi (second generation of amoraim).

He was one of several amoraim named Hamnuna. He is not to be confused with the Rav Hamnuna Saba mentioned in the Zohar, who is said to have been a tanna.

== Biography ==
His primary teacher was Rav, but he also learned from Rav Adda bar Ahavah and Rav Yitzchak bar Ashian

Once Rav's students ate together on Friday afternoon, and asked Rav Hamnuna Saba to tell them when Shabbat began so that they could remove the table and reset it for the Shabbat meal. Rav Hamnuna Saba replied that this was unnecessary, since according to Rav one must only recite kiddush and then may continue with the meal as a Shabbat meal.

According to tradition, he is buried in a cave just south of Meron, at the road bend.
