= Hamnuna III =

3rd century Babylonian rabbi

Rav Hamnuna III, one of several ancient rabbis named Hamnuna, was a rabbi mentioned in the Talmud. He lived in Babylonia and belonged to the third generation of amoraim.

== Biography ==
He was from the city of Harpania, but would pay taxes to Pum-Nahara.

He was a student of Rav. He was the leading student of Rav Yehudah, who greatly respected him. He also studied under Ulla and Rav Chisda.

He was close friends with Rav Chisda. The two spent much time together, and Rav Chisda would enthusiastically praise Rav Hamnuna's scholarship.

After Rav Chisda praised him to Rav Huna, the latter asked Rav Chisda to bring Rav Hamnuna to meet him. Rav Hamnuna showed up bareheaded, as he was unmarried and at the time only married men would cover their heads. Rav Huna told him not to return until he was married - as in his opinion men should get married promptly in order to avoid the risk of illicit sexual thoughts. After getting married, Rav Hamnuna returned to Rav Huna and became his leading student.

Rav Hamnuna's other friends included Rabbah and Rav Yosef.

He died close in time to Rabbah bar Rav Huna, and the two were brought to burial in the Land of Israel. Another tradition says he was buried in a place called Harta Deargiz; it is possible that he was initially buried there and his remains later brought to Israel.
