= V'Zot HaBerachah =

Last of the weekly Torah portions

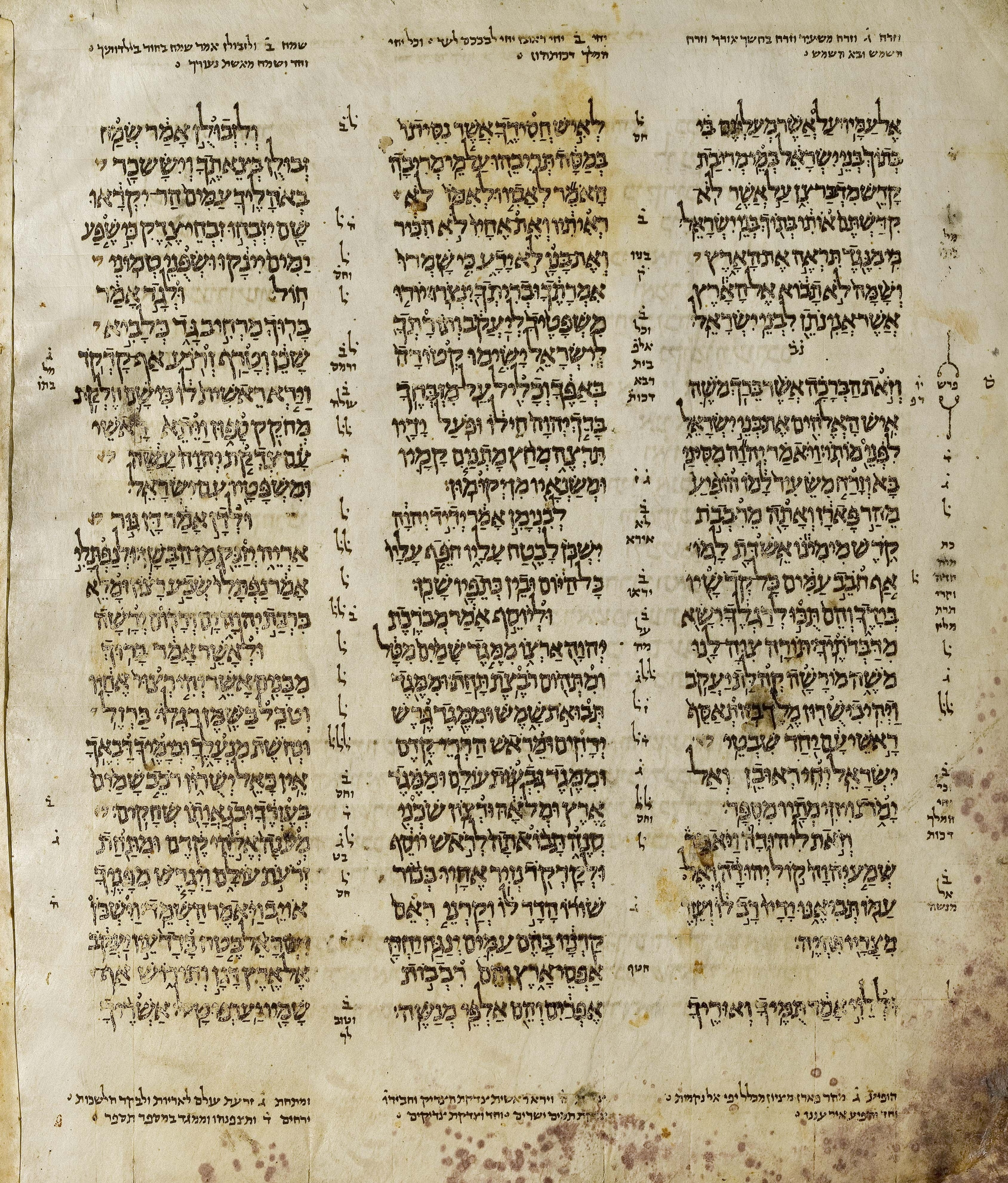
Deuteronomy 32:50–33:29 in the Aleppo Codex

V'Zot HaBerachah (Note: also transliterated as VeZos HaBerachah, VeZot Haberakha, V'Zeis Habrocho, V'Zaus Haberocho, V'Zois Haberuchu, Wazoth Habborocho, or Zos Habrocho) (וְזֹאת הַבְּרָכָה—Hebrew for "and this is the blessing," the first words in the parashah) is the 54th and final weekly Torah portion (פָּרָשָׁה, parashah) in the annual Jewish cycle of Torah reading and the 11th and last in the Book of Deuteronomy. It constitutes Deuteronomy 33:1–34:12. The parashah sets out Moses' farewell blessing of the 12 Tribes of Israel and concludes with his death.

It is made up of 1,969 Hebrew letters, 512 Hebrew words, and 41 verses. The parashah has the fewest letters and words, (Parashah Vayelech has fewer verses, with 30), of any of the 54 weekly Torah portions. Jews generally read it in September or October on the Simchat Torah festival. Immediately after reading Parashah V'Zot HaBerachah, Jews also read the beginning of the Torah, Genesis 1:1–2:3 (the beginning of Parashah Bereshit), as the second Torah reading for Simchat Torah.

== Readings ==
In traditional Torah reading, the parashah is divided into seven readings, or עליות, aliyot. In the Masoretic Text of the Tanakh (Hebrew Bible), Parashah V'Zot HaBerachah has two "open portion" (פתוחה, petuchah) divisions (roughly equivalent to paragraphs, often abbreviated with the Hebrew letter פ (peh)). The first open portion coincides with the first reading, and the second open portion spans the balance of the parashah. Parashah V'Zot HaBerachah has several further subdivisions, called "closed portion" (סתומה, setumah) (abbreviated with the Hebrew letter ס (samekh)), within the open portion divisions. The closed portion subdivisions often set apart discussions of separate tribes.

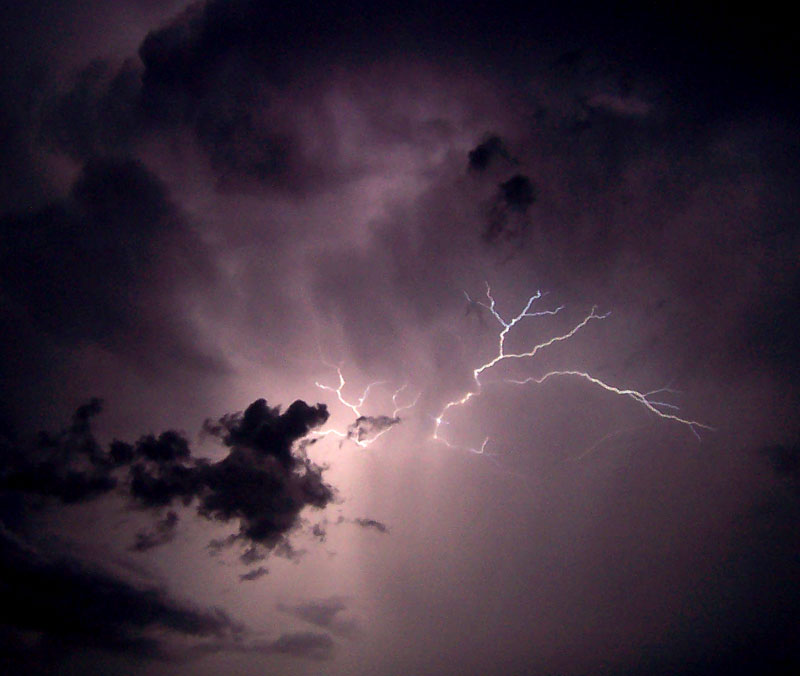
"The Lord . . . came from the myriads holy, at His right hand was a fiery law to them." (Deuteronomy 33:2.)

=== First reading—Deuteronomy 33:1–7 ===
In the first reading, before he died, Moses, the man of God, bade the Israelites farewell with this blessing: God came from Sinai, shone on them from Seir, appeared from Paran, and approached from Ribeboth-kodesh, lightning flashing from God's right. God loved the people, holding them in God's hand. The people followed in God's steps, accepting God's Torah as the heritage of the congregation of Jacob. God became King in Jeshurun when the chiefs of the tribes of Israel assembled. Moses prayed that the Tribe of Reuben survive, though its numbers were few. A closed portion ends here.

In the continuation of the reading, Moses asked God to hear the voice of the Tribe of Judah, restore it, and help it against its foes. The first reading and the first open portion end here.

=== Second reading—Deuteronomy 33:8–12 ===
In the second reading, Moses prayed that God would be with the Levites, who held God's Urim and Thummim, whom God tested at Massah and Meribah, who disregarded family ties to carry out God's will, who would teach God's laws to Israel, and who would offer God's incense and offerings. Moses asked God to bless their substance, favor their undertakings, and smite their enemies. A closed portion ends here.

In the continuation of the reading, Moses said that God loved and always protected the Tribe of Benjamin, who rested securely beside God, between God's shoulders. The second reading and a closed portion end here.

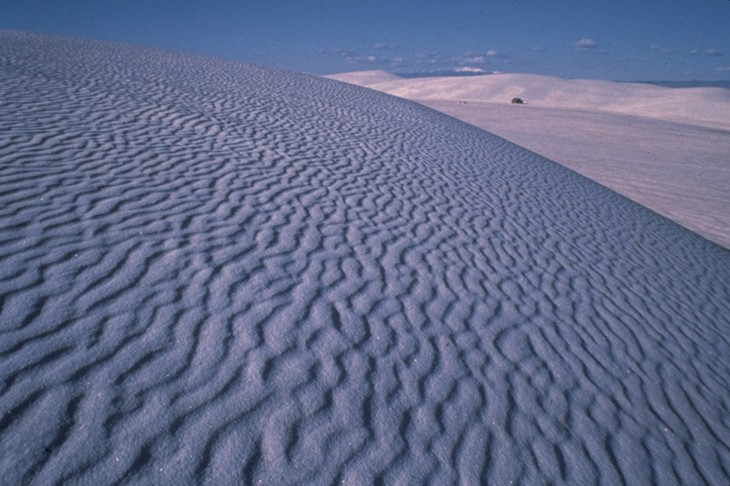
"Zebulun . . . and Issachar . . . shall suck the abundance of the seas and the hidden treasures of the sand." (Deuteronomy 33:18–19.)

=== Third reading—Deuteronomy 33:13–17 ===
In the third reading, Moses called on God to bless the Tribe of Joseph with dew, the yield of the sun, crops in season, the bounty of the hills, and the favor of the Presence in the burning bush. Moses likened the tribe to a firstling bull, with horns like a wild ox, who gores the peoples from one end of the earth to the other. The third reading and a closed portion end here.

=== Fourth reading—Deuteronomy 33:18–21 ===
In the fourth reading, Moses exhorted the Tribe of Zebulun to rejoice on its journeys, and the Tribe of Issachar in its tents. They invited their kin to the mountain where they offered sacrifices of success; they drew from the riches of the sea and the hidden hoards of the sand. A closed portion ends here.

"Gad . . . dwells like a lion." (Deuteronomy 33:20.) (brick panel from the Procession Way of Babylon, now at the Pergamon Museum)

In the continuation of the reading, Moses blessed the God who enlarged the Tribe of Gad, who was poised like a lion, who chose the best, the portion of the revered chieftain, who executed God's judgments for Israel. The fourth reading and a closed portion end here.

=== Fifth reading—Deuteronomy 33:22–26 ===
In the fifth reading, Moses called the Tribe of Dan a lion's whelp that leapt from Bashan. Moses told the Tribe of Naphtali, sated with favor and blessed by God, to take possession on the west and south. A closed portion ends here.

In the continuation of the reading, Moses prayed that the Tribe of Asher be the favorite among the tribes, dip its feet in oil, and have door bolts of iron and copper and security all its days. Moses said that there was none like God, riding through the heavens to help. The fifth reading ends here.

=== Sixth reading—Deuteronomy 33:27–29 ===
In the sixth reading, Moses said that God is an everlasting refuge and support, who drove out the enemy. Thus Israel dwelt untroubled in safety in a land of grain and wine under heaven's dripping dew. Who was like Israel, a people delivered by God, God's protecting Shield and Sword triumphant over Israel's cringing enemies. The sixth reading and a closed portion end here with the end of chapter 33.

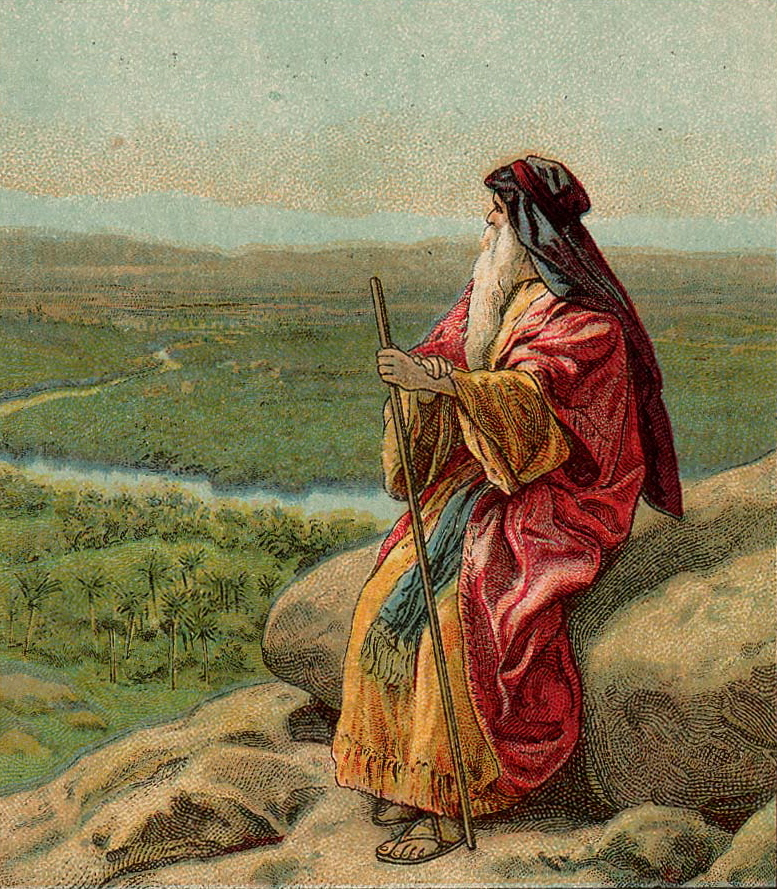
The Death of Moses (illustration from a Bible card published 1907 by the Providence Lithograph Company)

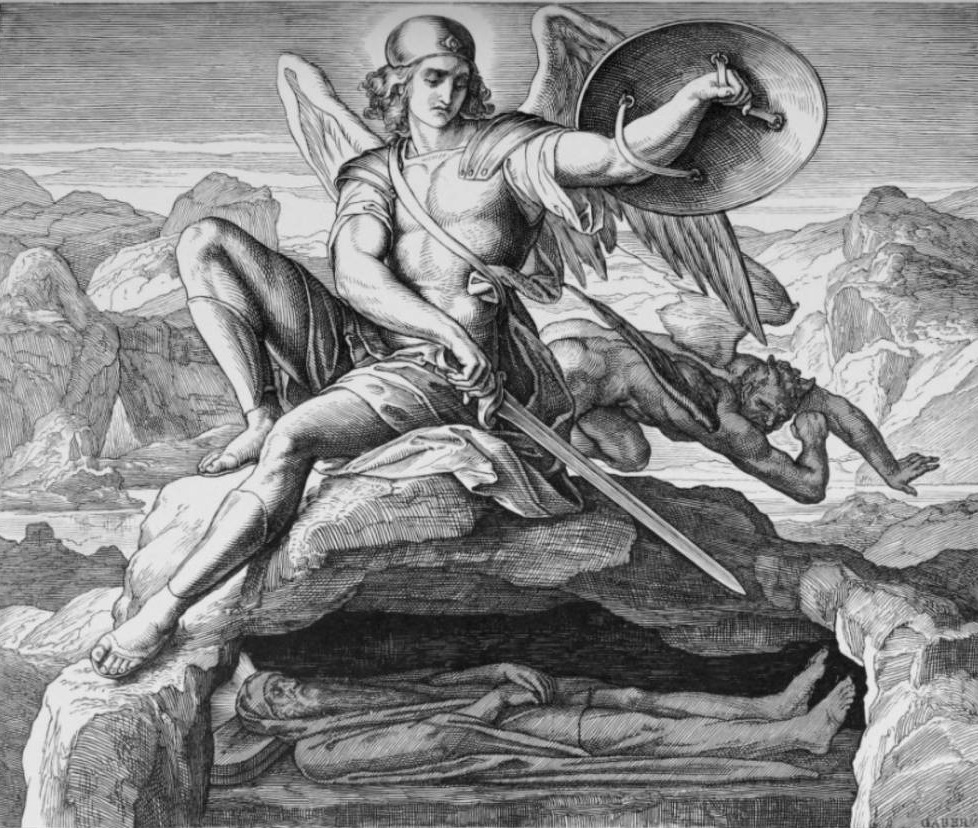
The Death of Moses (illustration from the 1890 Holman Bible)

=== Seventh reading—Deuteronomy 34 ===
In the seventh reading, Moses went up from the steppes of Moab to Mount Nebo, and God showed him the whole land. God told Moses that this was the land that God had sworn to assign to the descendants of Abraham, Isaac, and Jacob. So Moses the servant of God died there, in the land of Moab, at God's command, and God buried him in the valley in the land of Moab, near Beth-peor, although no one knew his burial place. Moses was 120 years old when he died, but his eyes were undimmed and his vigor unabated. The Israelites mourned for 30 days. Joshua was filled with the spirit of wisdom because Moses had laid his hands on him, and the Israelites heeded him.

Never again did there arise in Israel a prophet like Moses, whom God singled out, face to face, for the signs and portents that God sent him to display against Pharaoh and Egypt, and for all the awesome power that Moses displayed before Israel. The seventh reading, the parashah, chapter 34, the book of Deuteronomy and the whole of the Torah end here.

== In inner-Biblical interpretation ==
The parashah has parallels or is discussed in these Biblical sources:

=== Deuteronomy chapter 33 ===
Genesis 49:3–27, Deuteronomy 33:6–25, and Judges 5:14–18 present parallel listings of the twelve tribes, presenting contrasting characterizations of their relative strengths:

Tribe	Genesis 49	Deuteronomy 33	Judges 5
Reuben	Jacob's first-born, Jacob's might, the first-fruits of Jacob's strength, the excellency of dignity, the excellency of power; unstable as water, he would not have the excellency because he mounted his father's bed and defiled it	let him live and not die and become few in number	among their divisions were great resolves of heart; they sat among the sheepfolds to hear the piping for the flocks, and did not contribute; at their divisions was great soul-searching
Simeon	brother of Levi, weapons of violence were their kinship; let Jacob's soul not come into their council, to their assembly, for in their anger they slew men, in their self-will they hewed oxen; cursed was their fierce anger and their cruel wrath, Jacob would divide and scatter them in Israel	not mentioned	not mentioned
Levi	brother of Simeon, weapons of violence were their kinship; let Jacob's soul not come into their council, to their assembly, for in their anger they slew men, in their self-will they hewed oxen; cursed was their fierce anger and their cruel wrath, Jacob would divide and scatter them in Israel	his Thummim and Urim would be with God; God proved him at Massah, with whom God strove at the waters of Meribah; he did not acknowledge his father, mother, brothers, or children; observed God's word, and would keep God's covenant; would teach Israel God's law; would put incense before God, and whole burnt-offerings on God's altar; God bless his substance, and accept the work of his hands; smite the loins of his enemies	not mentioned
Judah	his brothers would praise him, his hand would be on the neck of his enemies, his father's sons would bow down before him; a lion's whelp, from the prey he is gone up, he stooped down, he couched as a lion and a lioness, who would rouse him? the scepter would not depart from him, nor the ruler's staff from between his feet, as long as men come to Shiloh, to him would the obedience of the peoples be; binding his foal to the vine and his ass's colt to the choice vine, he washes his garments in wine, his eyes would be red with wine, and his teeth white with milk	God hear his voice, and bring him in to his people; his hands would contend for him, and God would help against his adversaries	not mentioned
Zebulun	would dwell at the shore of the sea, would be a shore for ships, his flank would be upon Zidon	he would rejoice in his going out, with Issachar he would call peoples to the mountain; there they would offer sacrifices of righteousness, for they would suck the abundance of the seas, and the hidden treasures of the sand	they that handle the marshal's staff; jeopardized their lives for Israel
Issachar	a large-boned ass, couching down between the sheepfolds, he saw a good resting-place and the pleasant land, he bowed his shoulder to bear and became a servant under task-work	he would rejoice in his tents, with Zebulun he would call peoples to the mountain; there they would offer sacrifices of righteousness, for they would suck the abundance of the seas, and the hidden treasures of the sand	their princes were with Deborah
Dan	would judge his people, would be a serpent in the way, a horned snake in the path, that bites the horse's heels, so that his rider falls backward	a lion's whelp, that leaps forth from Bashan	sojourned by the ships, and did not contribute
Gad	a troop would troop upon him, but he would troop upon their heel	blessed be God Who enlarges him; he dwells as a lioness, and tears the arm and the crown of the head; he chose a first part for himself, for there a portion of a ruler was reserved; and there came the heads of the people, he executed God's righteousness and ordinances with Israel	Gilead stayed beyond the Jordan and did not contribute
Asher	his bread would be fat, he would yield royal dainties	blessed above sons; let him be the favored of his brothers, and let him dip his foot in oil; iron and brass would be his bars; and as his days, so would his strength be	dwelt at the shore of the sea, abided by its bays, and did not contribute
Naphtali	a hind let loose, he gave goodly words	satisfied with favor, full with God's blessing, would possess the sea and the south	were upon the high places of the field of battle
Joseph	a fruitful vine by a fountain, its branches run over the wall, the archers have dealt bitterly with him, shot at him, and hated him; his bow abode firm, and the arms of his hands were made supple by God, who would help and bless him with blessings of heaven above, the deep beneath, the breast and the womb; Jacob's blessings, mighty beyond the blessings of his ancestors, would be on his head, and on the crown of the head of the prince among his brothers	blessed of God was his land; for the precious things of heaven, for the dew, and for the deep beneath, and for the precious things of the fruits of the sun, and for the precious things of the yield of the moons, for the tops of the ancient mountains, and for the precious things of the everlasting hills, and for the precious things of the earth and the fullness thereof, and the good will of God; the blessing would come upon the head of Joseph, and upon the crown of the head of him that is prince among his brothers; his firstling bullock, majesty was his; and his horns were the horns of the wild-ox; with them he would gore all the peoples to the ends of the earth; they were the ten thousands of Ephraim and the thousands of Manasseh	out of Ephraim came they whose root is in Amalek
Benjamin	a ravenous wolf, in the morning he devoured the prey, at evening he divided the spoil	God's beloved would dwell in safety by God; God covered him all the day, and dwelt between his shoulders	came after Ephraim

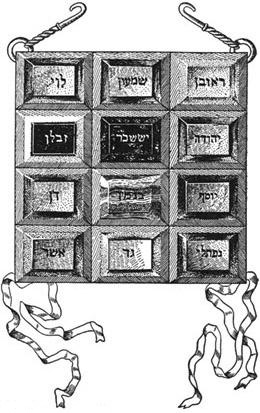
The Breastplate of the High Priest (illustration from the 1905–1906 Jewish Encyclopedia)

The Hebrew Bible refers to the Urim and Thummim in Exodus 28:30; Leviticus 8:8; Numbers 27:21; Deuteronomy 33:8; 1 Samuel 14:41 ("Thammim") and 28:6; Ezra 2:63; and Nehemiah 7:65; and may refer to them in references to "sacred utensils" in Numbers 31:6 and the Ephod in 1 Samuel 14:3 and 19; 23:6 and 9; and 30:7–8; and Hosea 3:4.

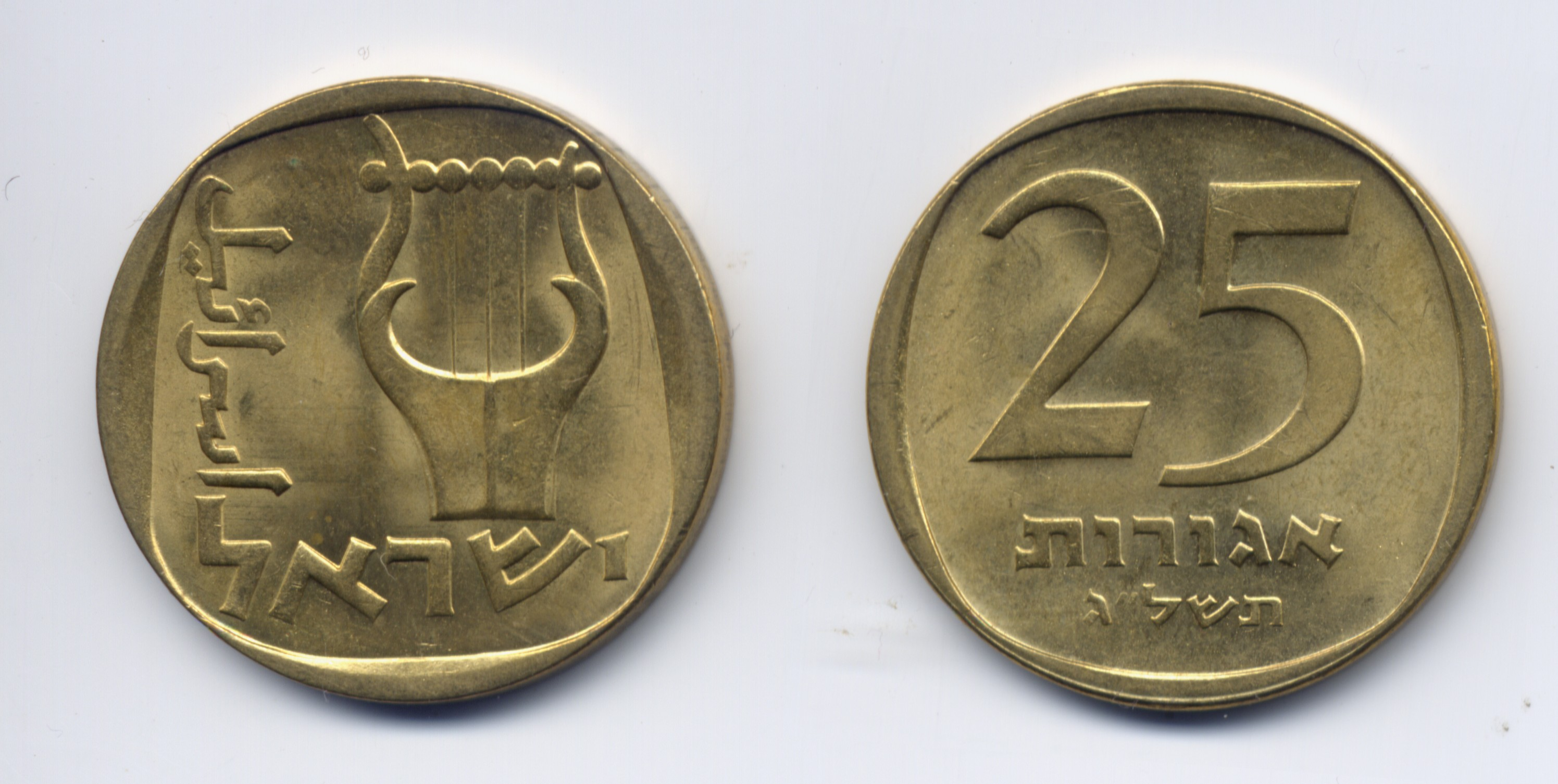
A lyre on an Israeli coin

Deuteronomy 33:10 reports that Levites taught the law. The Levites' role as teachers of the law also appears in the books of 2 Chronicles, Nehemiah, and Malachi. Deuteronomy 17:9–10 reports that they served as judges. Numbers 8:13–19 tells that they did the service of the tent of meeting. And Deuteronomy 10:8 reports that they blessed God's name. 1 Chronicles 23:3–5 reports that of 38,000 Levite men aged 30 and up, 24,000 oversaw the work of the Temple in Jerusalem, 6,000 were officers and magistrates, 4,000 were gatekeepers, and 4,000 praised God with instruments and song. 1 Chronicles 15:16 reports that King David installed Levites as singers with musical instruments, harps, lyres, and cymbals, and 1 Chronicles 16:4 reports that David appointed Levites to minister before the Ark, to invoke, to praise, and to extol God. And 2 Chronicles 5:12 reports at the inauguration of Solomon's Temple, Levites sang dressed in fine linen, holding cymbals, harps, and lyres, to the east of the altar, and with them 120 priests blew trumpets. 2 Chronicles 20:19 reports that Levites of the sons of Kohath and of the sons of Korah extolled God in song. Eleven Psalms identify themselves as of the Korahites. And Maimonides and the siddur report that the Levites would recite the Psalm for the Day in the Temple.

=== Deuteronomy chapter 34 ===
While Moses complained in Deuteronomy 31:2 that he could no longer go out and come in, Deuteronomy 34:7 insists that at his death, his eye was not dim, nor his natural force abated.

The characterization of Moses as the "servant of the Lord" (עֶבֶד-יְהוָה, eved-Adonai) in Deuteronomy 34:5 is echoed in the haftarah for the parashah and is then often repeated in the book of Joshua, and thereafter in 2 Kings and 2 Chronicles. By the end of the book of Joshua, Joshua himself has earned the title. And thereafter, David is also called by the same title.

== In classical Rabbinic interpretation ==
The parashah is discussed in these rabbinic sources from the era of the Mishnah and the Talmud:

=== Deuteronomy chapter 33 ===
Reading Deuteronomy 33:1, "This is the blessing with which Moses, the man of God, bade the Israelites farewell before his death," the Sifre taught that since Moses had earlier said harsh words to the Israelites, at this point Moses said to them words of comfort. And from Moses did the prophets learn how to address the Israelites, for they would first say harsh words to the Israelites and then say words of comfort.

A midrash told that God had Moses bless Israel in Deuteronomy 33 because Moses was superior to Adam, Noah, Abraham, Isaac, and Jacob.

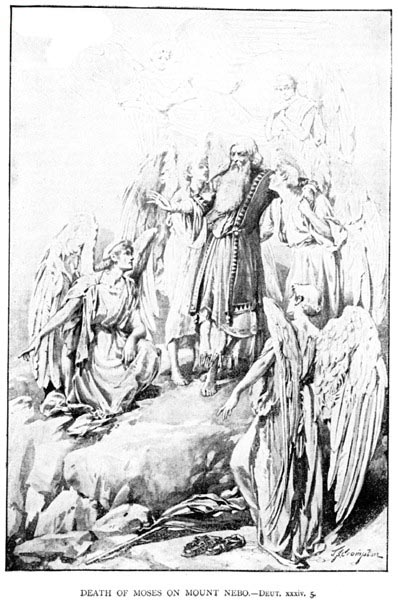
Death of Moses on Mount Nebo (illustration by James Shaw Crompton (1853–1916))

Noting that Deuteronomy 33:1 calls Moses "the man of God," the Sifre counted Moses among ten men whom Scripture calls "man of God," along with Elkanah, Samuel, David, Shemaiah, Iddo, Elijah, Elisha, Micah, and Amoz.

Rabbi Joḥanan counted Deuteronomy 33:1 among ten instances in which Scripture refers to the death of Moses (including three in the parashah and two in the haftarah for the parashah), teaching that God did not finally seal the harsh decree until God declared it to Moses. Rabbi Joḥanan cited these ten references to the death of Moses: (1) Deuteronomy 4:22: "But I must die in this land; I shall not cross the Jordan"; (2) Deuteronomy 31:14: "The Lord said to Moses: 'Behold, your days approach that you must die'"; (3) Deuteronomy 31:27: "[E]ven now, while I am still alive in your midst, you have been defiant toward the Lord; and how much more after my death"; (4) Deuteronomy 31:29: "For I know that after my death, you will act wickedly and turn away from the path that I enjoined upon you"; (5) Deuteronomy 32:50: "And die in the mount that you are about to ascend, and shall be gathered to your kin, as your brother Aaron died on Mount Hor and was gathered to his kin"; (6) Deuteronomy 33:1: "This is the blessing with which Moses, the man of God, bade the Israelites farewell before his death"; (7) Deuteronomy 34:5: "So Moses the servant of the Lord died there in the land of Moab, at the command of the Lord"; (8) Deuteronomy 34:7: "Moses was 120 years old when he died"; (9) Joshua 1:1: "Now it came to pass after the death of Moses"; and (10) Joshua 1:2: "Moses My servant is dead." Rabbi Joḥanan taught that ten times it was decreed that Moses should not enter the Land of Israel, but the harsh decree was not finally sealed until God revealed it to him and declared (as reported in Deuteronomy 3:27): "It is My decree that you should not pass over."

Rabbi Tarfon taught that God came from Mount Sinai (or others say Mount Seir) and was revealed to the children of Esau, as Deuteronomy 33:2 says, "The Lord came from Sinai, and rose from Seir to them," and "Seir" means the children of Esau, as Genesis 36:8 says, "And Esau dwelt in Mount Seir." God asked them whether they would accept the Torah, and they asked what was written in it. God answered that it included (in Exodus 20:13 and Deuteronomy 5:17, "You shall do no murder." The children of Esau replied that they were unable to abandon the blessing with which Isaac blessed Esau in Genesis 27:40, "By your sword shall you live." From there, God turned and was revealed to the children of Ishmael, as Deuteronomy 33:2 says, "He shined forth from Mount Paran," and "Paran" means the children of Ishmael, as Genesis 21:21 says of Ishmael, "And he dwelt in the wilderness of Paran." God asked them whether they would accept the Torah, and they asked what was written in it. God answered that it included (in Exodus 20:13 and Deuteronomy 5:17), "You shall not steal." The children of Ishamel replied that they were unable to abandon their fathers' custom, as Joseph said in Genesis 40:15 (referring to the Ishmaelites' transaction reported in Genesis 37:28), "For indeed I was stolen away out of the land of the Hebrews." From there, God sent messengers to all the nations of the world asking them whether they would accept the Torah, and they asked what was written in it. God answered that it included (in Exodus 20:3) and Deuteronomy 5:7), "You shall have no other gods before me." They replied that they had no delight in the Torah, therefore let God give it to God's people, as Psalm 29:11 says, "The Lord will give strength [identified with the Torah] to His people; the Lord will bless His people with peace." From there, God returned and was revealed to the children of Israel, as Deuteronomy 33:2 says, "And he came from the ten thousands of holy ones," and the expression "ten thousands" means the children of Israel, as Numbers 10:36 says, "And when it rested, he said, 'Return, O Lord, to the ten thousands of the thousands of Israel.'" With God were thousands of chariots and 20,000 angels, and God's right hand held the Torah, as Deuteronomy 33:2 says, "At his right hand was a fiery law to them."

The Sifre said that in Deuteronomy 33:2, Moses began his blessing of the Israelites by first speaking praise for God, not by dealing with what Israel needed first. The Sifre likened Moses to an orator hired to speak at court on behalf of a client. The orator did not begin by speaking of his client's needs, but first praised the king, saying that the world was happy because of his rule and his judgment. Only then did the orator raise his client's needs. And then the orator closed by once again praising the king. Similarly, Moses closed in Deuteronomy 33:26 praising God, saying, "There is none like God, O Jeshurun." Similarly, the Sifre said, the blessings of the Amidah prayer do not begin with the supplicant's needs, but start with praise for God, "The great, mighty, awesome God." Only then does the congregant pray about freeing the imprisoned and healing the sick. And at the end, the prayer returns to praise for God, saying, "We give thanks to You."

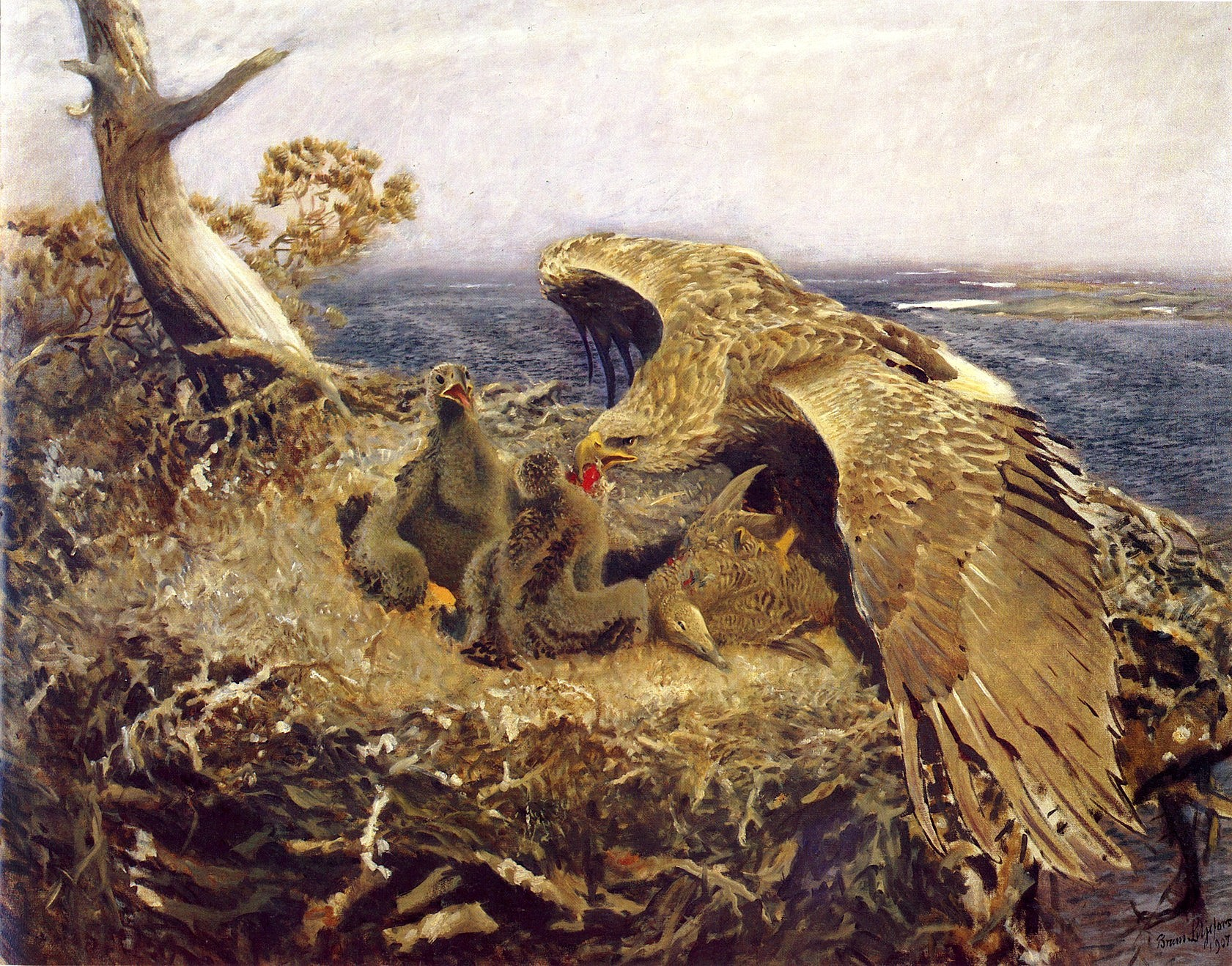
Sea Eagle's Nest (1907 painting by Bruno Liljefors)

Interpreting the words of Deuteronomy 33:2, "The Lord came from Sinai", the Sifre taught that when God came to give the Torah to Israel, God came not from just one direction, but from all four directions. The Sifre read in Deuteronomy 33:2 a list of three directions, when it says, "The Lord came from Sinai, and rose from Seir to them; He shined forth from Mount Paran, and He came from Ribeboth-kodesh." And the Sifre found the fourth direction in Habakkuk 3:3, which says, "God comes from the south." Thus, the Sifre expanded on the metaphor of God as an eagle in Deuteronomy 32:11, teaching that just as a mother eagle enters her nest only after shaking her chicks with her wings, fluttering from tree to tree to wake them up, so that they will have the strength to receive her, so when God revealed God's self to give the Torah to Israel, God did not appear from just a single direction, but from all four directions, as Deuteronomy 33:2 says, "The Lord came from Sinai, and rose from Seir to them," and Habakkuk 3:3 says, "God comes from the south."

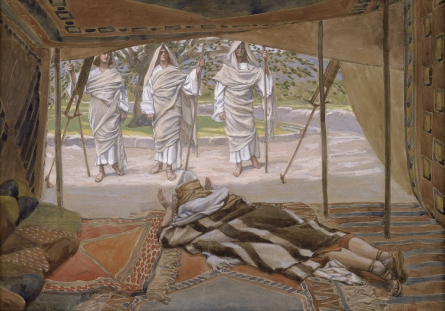
Abraham and the Three Angels (watercolor circa 1896–1902 by James Tissot)

The Tosefta found in Deuteronomy 33:2 demonstration of the proposition that Providence rewards a person measure for measure. Thus just as Abraham rushed three times to serve the visiting angels in Genesis 18:2, 6, and 7, so God rushed three times in service of Abraham's children when in Genesis 18:2, God "came from Sinai, rose from Seir to them, [and] shined forth from mount Paran."

Reading Deuteronomy 33:2, "The Lord came from Sinai and rose from Seir to them, He shined forth from Mount Paran," together with Habakkuk 3:3, "God comes from Teman," the Gemara asked what God sought in Seir and Mount Paran. Rabbi Joḥanan taught that God offered the Torah to every nation and tongue, but none accepted it, until God came to Israel, who received it. But the Gemara continued that reading Exodus 19:17, "And they stood at the foot of the mountain," Rav Dimi bar Hama taught that in offering the Torah to Israel, God suspended the mountain over Israel and told them that if they accepted the Torah, all would be well, but if not, that place would be their grave.

The students of Rav Shila's academy deduced from the words "from His right hand, a fiery law for them" in Deuteronomy 33:2 that Moses received the Torah from God's hand.

Rabbi Simeon ben Lakish (Resh Lakish) taught that the Torah that God gave Moses was of white fire and its writing of black fire. It was itself fire and it was hewn out of fire, completely formed of fire, and given in fire, as Deuteronomy 33:2 says, "At His right hand was a fiery law to them."

Rabbi Abin son of Rav Ada in the name of Rabbi Isaac deduced from Deuteronomy 33:2 that God wears tefillin. For Isaiah 62:8 says: "The Lord has sworn by His right hand, and by the arm of His strength." "By His right hand" refers to the Torah, for Deuteronomy 33:2 says, "At His right hand was a fiery law to them." "And by the arm of His strength" refers to tefillin, as Psalm 29:11 says, "The Lord will give strength to His people," and tefillin are a strength to Israel, for Deuteronomy 28:10 says, "And all the peoples of the earth shall see that the name of the Lord is called upon you, and they shall be afraid of You," and Rabbi Eliezer the Great said that this refers to tefillin of the head (in which the Name of God is written in fulfillment of Deuteronomy 28:10).

The midrash and the Talmud differed over which five brothers Joseph presented to Pharaoh in Genesis 47:2, and each source employed the Farewell of Moses in Deuteronomy 33:2–29 to make its argument. The midrash read the word from among (מִקְצֵה, mikzeh) in Genesis 47:2, "And from among (מִקְצֵה, mikzeh) his brethren he took five men," to mean "from the end," implying inferiority. The midrash thus concluded that they were not the strongest of the brothers and named them as Reuben, Simeon, Levi, Benjamin, and Issachar. The midrash said that Joseph took these five brothers, because he reasoned that if he presented the strongest to Pharaoh, then Pharaoh would on make them his warriors. Therefore, Joseph presented these five, who were not mighty men. The midrash taught that we know that they were not strong from the blessing of Moses in Deuteronomy 33:2–29, where every brother whose name Moses repeated in his blessing was mighty, while every brother whose name Moses did not repeat was not mighty. Judah, whose name he repeated, was mighty, for Deuteronomy 33:7 says, "And this for Judah, and he said: 'Hear, Lord, the voice of Judah'"; therefore, Joseph did not present him to Pharaoh. Likewise Naphtali, as Deuteronomy 33:23 says, "And of Naphtali he said: 'O Naphtali, satisfied with favor.'" Likewise, Asher, of whom Deuteronomy 33:24 says, "And of Asher he said: 'Blessed be Asher above sons.'" Likewise, Dan, of whom Deuteronomy 33:22 says, "And of Dan he said: 'Dan is a lion's whelp.'" Zebulun too, of whom Deuteronomy 33:18 says, "And of Zebulun he said: 'Rejoice, Zebulun, in your going out.'" Gad too, of whom Deuteronomy 33:20 says, "And of Gad he said: 'Blessed be He that enlarges Gad.'" Therefore, Joseph did not present them to Pharaoh. But the others, whose names were not repeated, were not mighty, therefore he presented them to Pharaoh. In the Babylonian Talmud, however, Rava asked Rabbah bar Mari who the five were. Rabbah bar Mari replied that Rabbi Joḥanan said that they were those whose names were repeated in the Farewell of Moses, Deuteronomy 33:2–29 (and thus the mightier of the brothers). Besides Judah, the five whose names Moses repeated were Dan, Zebulun, Gad, Asher and Naphtali. Saying why Moses repeated Judah's name in Deuteronomy 33:7, but Joseph nonetheless excluded him from the five, Rabbah bar Mari said that Moses repeated Judah's name for a different purpose, which Rabbi Samuel bar Naḥmani recounted that Rabbi Joḥanan said. Rabbi Joḥanan interpreted the words of Deuteronomy 33:6–7, "Let Reuben live and not die, in that his men become few, and this is for Judah," to teach that during the 40 years that the Israelites were in the wilderness, the bones of Judah rolled around detached in the coffin that conveyed the bones of the heads of the tribes from Egypt to the Promised Land along with Joseph's remains. But then Moses solicited God for mercy by noting that Judah brought Reuben to confess his own sin in Genesis 35:22 and Genesis 49:4 (lying with Bilhah) by himself making public confession in Genesis 38:26 (when Judah admitted that Tamar was more righteous than he was). Therefore, in Deuteronomy 33:7, Moses exhorted God: "Hear Lord the voice of Judah!" Thereupon God fitted each of Judah's limbs into its original place as one whole skeleton. Judah was, however, not permitted to ascend to the heavenly academy, until Moses said in Deuteronomy 33:7, "And bring him in to his people." As, however, Judah still did not know what the Rabbis were saying in that assembly and was thus unable to argue with the Rabbis on matters of the law, Moses said in Deuteronomy 33:7, "His hands shall contend for him!" As again he was unable to conclude legal discussions in accordance with the Law, Moses said in Deuteronomy 33:7, "You shall be a help against his adversaries!"

Rabbi Simlai taught that God communicated to Moses a total of 613 commandments—365 negative commandments, corresponding to the number of days in the solar year, and 248 positive commandments, corresponding to the number of the parts in the human body. Rav Hamnuna said that one may derive this from Deuteronomy 33:4, "Moses commanded us Torah, an inheritance of the congregation of Jacob." For the letters of the word Torah (תּוֹרָה) have a numerical value of 611 (as ת equals 400, ו equals 6, ר equals 200, and ה equals 5, using the interpretive technique of Gematria). And the Gemara taught that the Israelites heard the words of the first two commandments (in Exodus 20:3–6) and Deuteronomy 5:7–10) directly from God and thus did not count them among the commandments that the Israelites heard from Moses. The Gemara taught that David reduced the number of precepts to eleven, as Psalm 15 says, "Lord, who shall sojourn in Your Tabernacle? Who shall dwell in Your holy mountain?—He who (1) walks uprightly, and (2) works righteousness, and (3) speaks truth in his heart; who (4) has no slander upon his tongue, (5) nor does evil to his fellow, (6) nor takes up a reproach against his neighbor, (7) in whose eyes a vile person is despised, but (8) he honors them who fear the Lord, (9) he swears to his own hurt and changes not, (10) he puts not out his money on interest, (11) nor takes a bribe against the innocent." Isaiah reduced them to six principles, as Isaiah 33:15–16 says, "He who (1) walks righteously, and (2) speaks uprightly, (3) he who despises the gain of oppressions, (4) who shakes his hand from holding of bribes, (5) who stops his ear from hearing of blood, (6) and shuts his eyes from looking upon evil; he shall dwell on high." Micah reduced them to three principles, as Micah 6:8 says, "It has been told you, o man, what is good, and what the Lord requires of you: only (1) to do justly, and (2) to love mercy, and (3) to walk humbly before your God." Isaiah reduced them to two principles, as Isaiah 56:1 says, "Thus says the Lord, (1) Keep justice and (2) do righteousness." Amos reduced them to one principle, as Amos 5:4 says, "For thus says the Lord to the house of Israel, 'Seek Me and live.'" To this Rav Naḥman bar Isaac demurred, saying that this might be taken as: "Seek Me by observing the whole Torah and live." The Gemara concluded that Habakkuk based all the Torah's commandments on one principle, as Habakkuk 2:4 says, "But the righteous shall live by his faith."

The Gemara counted Deuteronomy 33:5, "And He was King in Jeshurun," among only three verses in the Torah that indisputably refer to God's Kingship and thus are suitable for recitation on Rosh Hashanah. The Gemara also counted Numbers 23:21, "The Lord his God is with him, and the shouting for the King is among them"; and Exodus 15:18, "The Lord shall reign for ever and ever." Rabbi Jose also counted as Kingship verses Deuteronomy 6:4, "Hear, O Israel, the Lord our God the Lord is One"; Deuteronomy 4:39, "And you shall know on that day and lay it to your heart that the Lord is God, ... there is none else"; and Deuteronomy 4:35, "To you it was shown, that you might know that the Lord is God, there is none else beside Him"; but Rabbi Judah said that none of these three is a Kingship verse. (The traditional Rosh Hashanah liturgy follows Rabbi Jose and recites Numbers 23:21, Deuteronomy 33:5, and Exodus 15:18, and then concludes with Deuteronomy 6:4.)

Rabbi Judah bar Simon taught that the blessing of Reuben by Moses in Deuteronomy 33:6, "Let Reuben live and not die," gained for Reuben life in the World to Come and brought him back together with his father Jacob. Rabbi Judah bar Simon read Deuteronomy 28:6, "Blessed shall you be when you come in, and blessed shall you be when you go out," to refer to Moses. Rabbi Judah bar Simon read "when you come in" to refer to Moses, because when he came into the world, he brought nearer to God Batya the daughter of Pharaoh (who by saving Moses from drowning merited life in the World to Come). And "blessed shall you be when you go out" also refers to Moses, for as he was departing the world, he brought Reuben nearer to his father Jacob, when Moses blessed Reuben with the words "Let Reuben live and not die" in Deuteronomy 33:6 (thus gaining for Reuben the life in the World to Come and thus proximity to Jacob that Reuben forfeited when he sinned against his father in Genesis 35:22 and became estranged from him in Genesis 49:4).

The Mishnah taught that the High Priest inquired of the Thummim and Urim in Deuteronomy 33:8 only for the king, for the court, or for one whom the community needed.

A baraita said they called the Thummim and Urim in Deuteronomy 33:8 by those names: The term Urim is like the Hebrew word for "lights," and thus they called it "Urim" because it enlightened. The term Thummim is like the Hebrew word tam meaning 'to be complete', and thus they called it "Thummim" because its predictions were fulfilled. The Gemara discussed how they used the Urim and Thummim: Rabbi Joḥanan said that the letters of the stones in the breastplate stood out to spell out the answer. Resh Lakish said that the letters joined each other to spell words. The Gemara said that the Hebrew letter צ, tsade, was missing from the list of the 12 tribes of Israel. Rabbi Samuel bar Isaac said that the stones of the breastplate also contained the names of Abraham, Isaac and Jacob. The Gemara said that the Hebrew letter ט, teth, was also missing. Rav Aha bar Jacob said that they also contained the words: "The tribes of Jeshurun." The Gemara taught that although the decree of a prophet could be revoked, the decree of the Urim and Thummim could not be revoked, as Numbers 27:21 says, "By the judgment of the Urim."

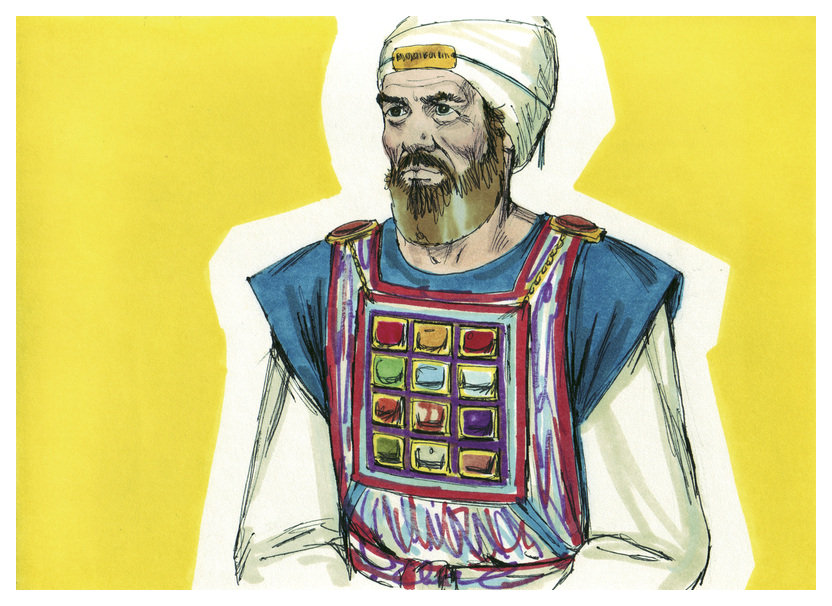
The High Priest wearing his Breastplate (1984 illustration by Jim Padgett, courtesy of Sweet Publishing)

The Pirke De-Rabbi Eliezer taught that when Israel sinned in the matter of the devoted things, as reported in Joshua 7:11, Joshua looked at the 12 stones corresponding to the 12 tribes that were upon the High Priest's breastplate. For every tribe that had sinned, the light of its stone became dim, and Joshua saw that the light of the stone for the Tribe of Judah had become dim. So Joshua knew that the tribe of Judah had transgressed in the matter of the devoted things. Similarly, the Pirke De-Rabbi Eliezer taught that Saul saw the Philistines turning against Israel, and he knew that Israel had sinned in the matter of the ban. Saul looked at the 12 stones, and for each tribe that had followed the law, its stone (on the High Priest's breastplate) shined with its light, and for each tribe that had transgressed, the light of its stone was dim. So Saul knew that the Tribe of Benjamin had trespassed in the matter of the ban.

The Mishnah reported that with the death of the former prophets, the Urim and Thummim ceased. In this connection, the Gemara reported differing views of who the former prophets were. Rav Huna said they were David, Samuel, and Solomon. Rav Nachman said that during the days of David, they were sometimes successful and sometimes not (getting an answer from the Urim and Thummim), for Zadok consulted it and succeeded, while Abiathar consulted it and was not successful, as 2 Samuel 15:24 reports, "And Abiathar went up." (He retired from the priesthood because the Urim and Thummim gave him no reply.) Rabbah bar Samuel asked whether the report of 2 Chronicles 26:5, "And he (King Uzziah of Judah) set himself to seek God all the days of Zechariah, who had understanding in the vision of God," did not refer to the Urim and Thummim. But the Gemara answered that Uzziah did so through Zechariah's prophecy. A baraita told that when the first Temple was destroyed, the Urim and Thummim ceased, and said Ezra 2:63 (reporting events after the Jews returned from the Babylonian Captivity), "And the governor said to them that they should not eat of the most holy things till there stood up a priest with Urim and Thummim," was a reference to the remote future, as when one speaks of the time of the Messiah. Rav Naḥman concluded that the term "former prophets" referred to a period before Haggai, Zechariah, and Malachi, who were latter prophets. And the Jerusalem Talmud taught that the "former prophets" referred to Samuel and David, and thus the Urim and Thummim did not function in the period of the First Temple, either.

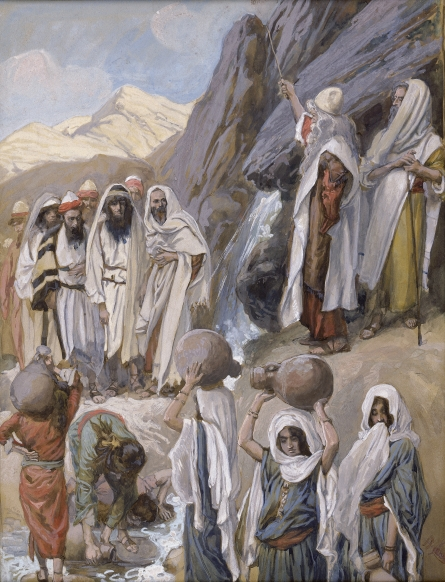
Moses Strikes the Rock (watercolor circa 1896–1902 by James Tissot)

Rabbi Hanina taught that the world was unworthy to have cedar trees, but God created them for the sake of the Tabernacle (for example, in the acacia-wood of Exodus 26:15) and the Temple, as Psalm 104:16 says, "The trees of the Lord have their fill, the cedars of Lebanon, which He has planted," once again interpreting Lebanon to mean the Temple. Rabbi Samuel ben Nahman in the name of Rabbi Jonathan taught that there are 24 kinds of cedars, of which seven are especially fine, as Isaiah 41:19 says, "I will plant in the wilderness the cedar, the acacia-tree, and the myrtle, and the oil-tree; I will set in the desert the cypress, the plane-tree, and the larch together." God foresaw that the Tabernacle would be made of these trees, as Psalm 104:17 says, "Wherein the birds make their nests," and "birds" refers to those birds that the priests offered. And when Psalm 104:17 says, "As for the stork (חֲסִידָה, chasidah), the fir-trees are her house," the חֲסִידָה, chasidah (stork) refers to the High Priest, of whom Deuteronomy 33:8 says, "Your Thummim and Your Urim be with Your holy one (חֲסִידֶךָ, chasidekha)."

A midrash employed a parable to explain why God held Aaron as well as Moses responsible when Moses struck the rock, as Numbers 20:12 reports, "and the Lord said to Moses and Aaron: 'Because you did not believe in me.'" The midrash told how a creditor came to take away a debtor's granary and took both the debtor's granary and the debtor's neighbor's granary. The debtor asked the creditor what his neighbor had done to warrant such treatment. Similarly, Moses asked God what Aaron had done to be blamed when Moses lost his temper. The midrash taught that it on this account that Deuteronomy 33:8 praises Aaron, saying, "And of Levi he said: 'Your Thummim and your Urim be with your holy one, whom you proved at Massah, with whom you strove at the waters of Meribah.'"

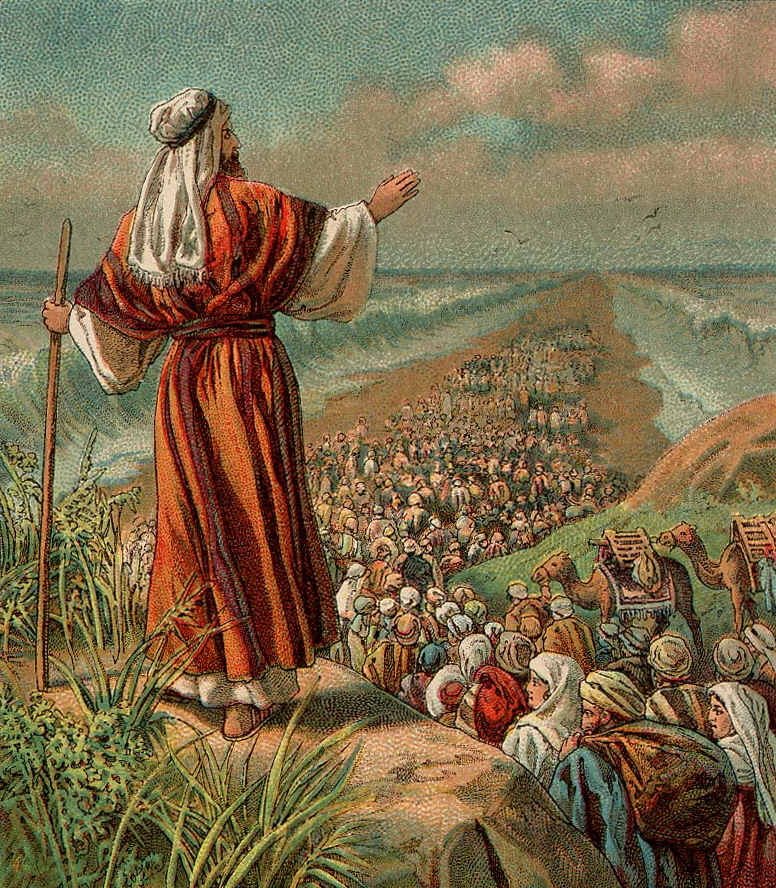
Israel's Escape from Egypt (illustration from a Bible card published 1907 by the Providence Lithograph Company)

Rabbi Meir taught that when the Israelites stood by the sea, the tribes competed over who would go into the sea first. The tribe of Benjamin went first, as Psalm 68:28 says: "There is Benjamin, the youngest, ruling them (רֹדֵם, rodem)," and Rabbi Meir read rodem, רֹדֵם, 'ruling them,' as רד ים, rad yam, 'descended into the sea.' Then the princes of Judah threw stones at them, as Psalm 68:28 says: "the princes of Judah their council (רִגְמָתָם, rigmatam)," and Rabbi Meir read רִגְמָתָם, rigmatam, as 'stoned them.' For that reason, Benjamin merited hosting the site of God's Temple, as Deuteronomy 33:12 says: "He dwells between his shoulders." Rabbi Judah answered Rabbi Meir that no tribe was willing to be the first to go into the sea. Then Nahshon ben Aminadab stepped forward and went into the sea first, praying in the words of Psalm 69:2–16, "Save me O God, for the waters come into my soul. I sink in deep mire, where there is no standing . . . . Let not the water overwhelm me, neither let the deep swallow me up." Moses was then praying, so God prompted Moses, in words parallel those of Exodus 14:15, "My beloved ones are drowning in the sea, and you prolong prayer before Me!" Moses asked God, "Lord of the Universe, what is there in my power to do?" God replied in the words of Exodus 14:15–16, "Speak to the children of Israel, that they go forward. And lift up your rod, and stretch out your hand over the sea, and divide it; and the children of Israel shall go into the midst of the sea on dry ground." Because of Nahshon's actions, Judah merited becoming the ruling power in Israel, as Psalm 114:2 says, "Judah became His sanctuary, Israel His dominion," and that happened because, as Psalm 114:3 says, "The sea saw [him], and fled."

Rabbi Joḥanan taught in the name of Rabbi Simeon ben Yoḥai that Deuteronomy 33:17 helps to show the value of Torah study and charity. Rabbi Joḥanan deduced from Isaiah 32:20, "Blessed are you who sow beside all waters, who send forth the feet of the ox and the donkey," that whoever engages in Torah study and charity is worthy of the inheritance of two tribes, Joseph and Issachar (as Deuteronomy 33:17 compares Joseph to an ox, and Genesis 49:14 compares Issachar to a donkey). Rabbi Joḥanan equated "sowing" with "charity," as Hosea 10:12 says, "Sow to yourselves in charity, reap in kindness." And Rabbi Joḥanan equated "water" with "Torah," as Isaiah 55:1 says, "Everyone who thirsts, come to the waters (that is, Torah)." Whoever engages in Torah study and charity is worthy of a canopy—that is, an inheritance—like Joseph, for Genesis 49:22 says, "Joseph is a fruitful bough . . . whose branches run over the wall." And such a person is also worthy of the inheritance of Issachar, as Genesis 49:14 says, "Issachar is a strong donkey" (which the Targum renders as rich with property). The Gemara also reported that some say that the enemies of such a person will fall before him as they did for Joseph, as Deuteronomy 33:17 says, "With them he shall push the people together, to the ends of the earth." And such a person is worthy of understanding like Issachar, as 1 Chronicles 12:32 says, "of the children of Issachar . . . were men who had understanding of the times to know what Israel ought to do."

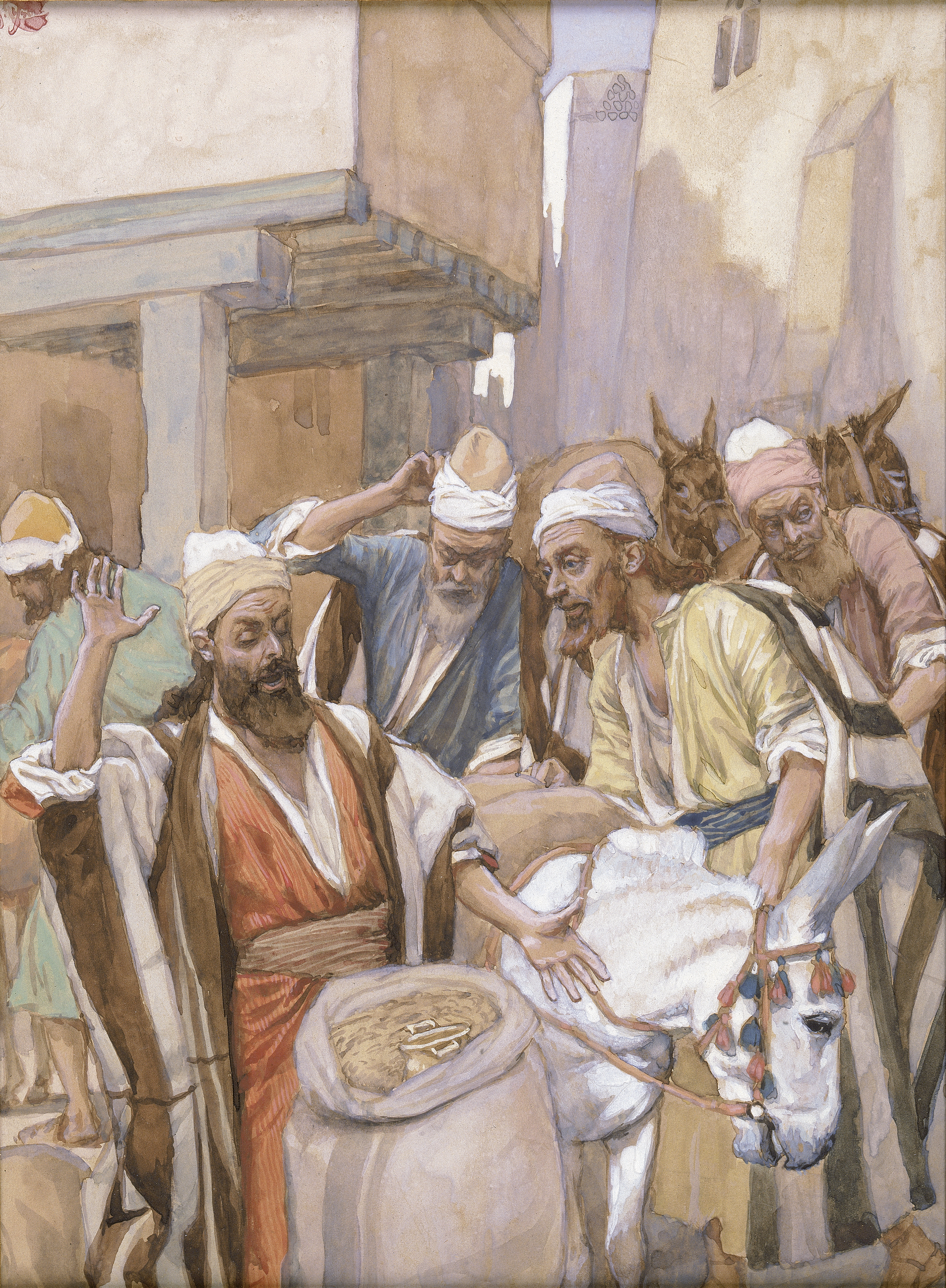
The Cup Found (watercolor circa 1896–1902 by James Tissot)

A midrash told that when in Genesis 44:12 the steward found Joseph's cup in Benjamin's belongings, his brothers beat Benjamin on his shoulders, calling him a thief and the son of a thief, and saying that he had shamed them as Rachel had shamed Jacob when she stole Laban's idols in Genesis 31:19. And by virtue of receiving those unwarranted blows between his shoulders, Benjamin's descendants merited having the Divine Presence rest between his shoulders and the Temple rest in Jerusalem, as Deuteronomy 33:12 reports, "He dwells between his shoulders"

Reading Deuteronomy 33:20 and 22 (and other verses), Rabbi Joḥanan said that the lion has six names—אֲרִי, ari in Deuteronomy 33:22; כְּפִיר, kefir; לָבִיא, lavi in Deuteronomy 33:20|HE}}; לַיִשׁ, laish; שַׁחַל, shachal; and שָׁחַץ, shachatz.

The Mishnah applied to Moses the words of Deuteronomy 33:21, "He executed the righteousness of the Lord and His ordinances with Israel," deducing therefrom that Moses was righteous and caused many to be righteous, and therefore the righteousness of the many was credited to him. And the Tosefta taught that the ministering angels mourned Moses with these words of Deuteronomy 33:21.

A midrash taught that as God created the four cardinal directions, so also did God set about God's throne four angels—Michael, Gabriel, Uriel, and Raphael—with Michael at God's right. The midrash taught that Michael got his name (מִי-כָּאֵל, Mi-ka'el) as a reward for the way that he praised God in two expressions that Moses employed. When the Israelites crossed the Red Sea, Moses began to chant, in the words of Exodus 15:11, "Who (מִי, mi) is like You, o Lord." And when Moses completed the Torah, he said, in the words of Deuteronomy 33:26, "There is none like God (כָּאֵל, ka'el), O Jeshurun." The midrash taught that mi (מִי) combined with ka'el (כָּאֵל) to form the name Mi-ka'el (מִי-כָּאֵל).

Reading the words, "And he lighted upon the place," in Genesis 28:11 to mean, "And he met the Divine Presence (Shechinah)," Rav Huna asked in Rabbi Ammi's name why Genesis 28:11 assigns to God the name "the Place." Rav Huna said that it is because God is the Place of the world (the world is contained in God, and not God in the world). Rabbi Jose ben Halafta taught that we do not know whether God is the place of God's world or whether God's world is God's place, but from Exodus 33:21, which says, "Behold, there is a place with Me," it follows that God is the place of God's world, but God's world is not God's place. Rabbi Isaac taught that reading Deuteronomy 33:27, "The eternal God is a dwelling place," one cannot know whether God is the dwelling-place of God's world or whether God's world is God's dwelling-place. But reading Psalm 90:1, "Lord, You have been our dwelling-place," it follows that God is the dwelling-place of God's world, but God's world is not God's dwelling-place. And Rabbi Abba ben Judan taught that God is like a warrior riding a horse with the warrior's robes flowing over on both sides of the horse. The horse is subsidiary to the rider, but the rider is not subsidiary to the horse. Thus Habakkuk 3:8 says, "You ride upon Your horses, upon Your chariots of victory."

A baraita taught that Rabbi Yosei read the words of Deuteronomy 33:27, "And underneath are the everlasting arms," to teach that the whole world rests upon God.

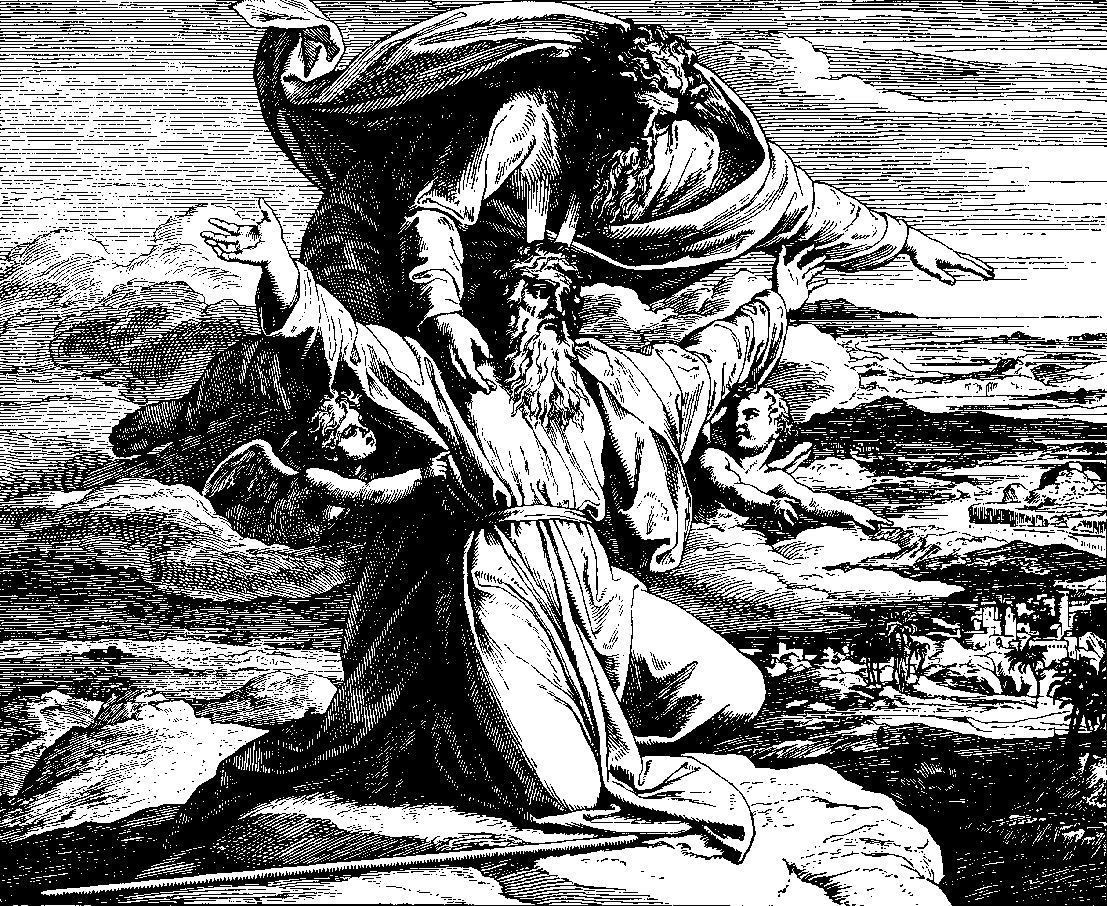
Moses Viewing the Promised Land (woodcut by Julius Schnorr von Carolsfeld from the 1860 Bible in Pictures)

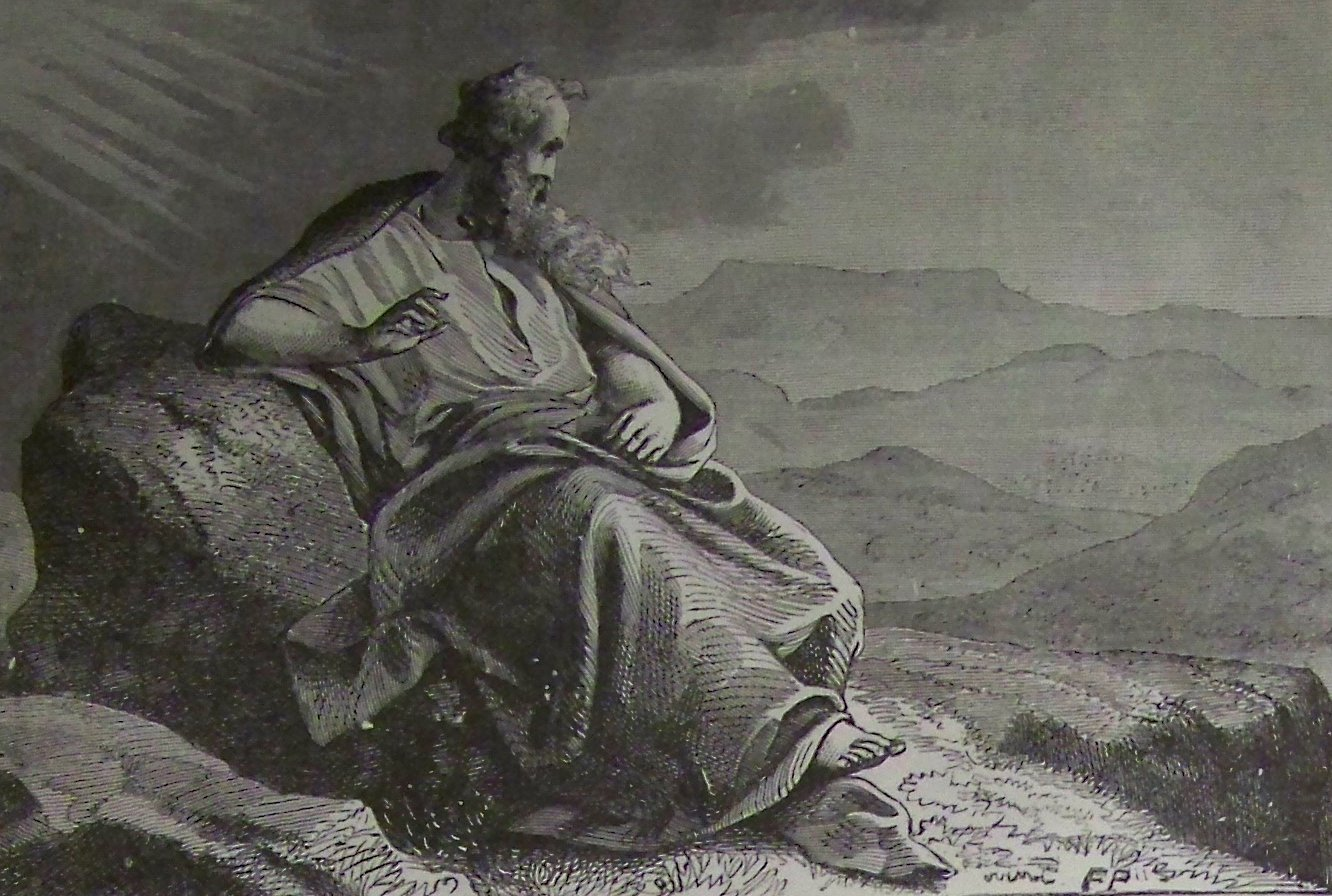
Moses Viewing the Promised Land (illustration from the 1890 Holman Bible)

=== Deuteronomy chapter 34 ===
The Sifre taught that one should not read Deuteronomy 34:1–2 to say, "the Lord showed him . . . as far as the hinder sea (יָּם, yam)," but, "the Lord showed him . . . as far as the final day (יּוֹם, yom)." The Sifre thus read Deuteronomy 34:1–2 to say that God showed Moses the entire history of the world, from the day on which God created the world to the day on which God would cause the dead to live again.

Rabbi Samuel ben Naḥman in the name of Rabbi Jonathan cited Deuteronomy 34:4 for the proposition that the dead can talk to each another. Deuteronomy 34:4 says: "And the Lord said to him (Moses): 'This is the land that I swore to Abraham, to Isaac, and to Jacob, saying . . . .'" Rabbi Samuel ben Naḥman reasoned that the word saying here indicates that just before Moses died, God told Moses to say to Abraham, Isaac, and Jacob that God had carried out the oath that God had sworn to them. The Gemara said that God told Moses to tell them so that they might be grateful to Moses for what he had done for their descendants.

The Sifre taught that the description of Deuteronomy 34:5 of Moses as "the servant of the Lord" was not one of derision but one of praise. For Amos 3:7 also called the former prophets "servants of the Lord," saying: "For the Lord God will do nothing without revealing His counsel to His servants the prophets."

Rabbi Eleazar taught that Miriam died with a Divine kiss, just as Moses had. As Deuteronomy 34:5 says, "So Moses the servant of the Lord died there in the land of Moab by the mouth of the Lord," and Numbers 20:1 says, "And Miriam died there"—both using the word there—Rabbi Eleazar deduced that both Moses and Miriam died the same way. Rabbi Eleazar said that Numbers 20:1 does not say that Miriam died "by the mouth of the Lord" because it would be indelicate to say so.

A baraita taught that Joshua wrote eight verses of the Torah, and the Gemara elaborated that some say that Joshua wrote the Torah's last eight verses. Another baraita (quoting Rabbi Judah, or some say Rabbi Nehemiah) questioned whether Moses could have written Deuteronomy 34:5, "And Moses the servant of the Lord died there," and explained that Moses wrote the entire Torah up until Deuteronomy 34:5, and Joshua wrote from Deuteronomy 34:5 to the end. But Rabbi Simeon read Deuteronomy 31:26, "Take this Torah scroll," to teach that the Torah was complete at that point. According to Rabbi Simeon, God dictated the entire text to Moses, who wrote it down. God dictated to Moses about Moses' death, and Moses wrote it down with tears in his eyes.

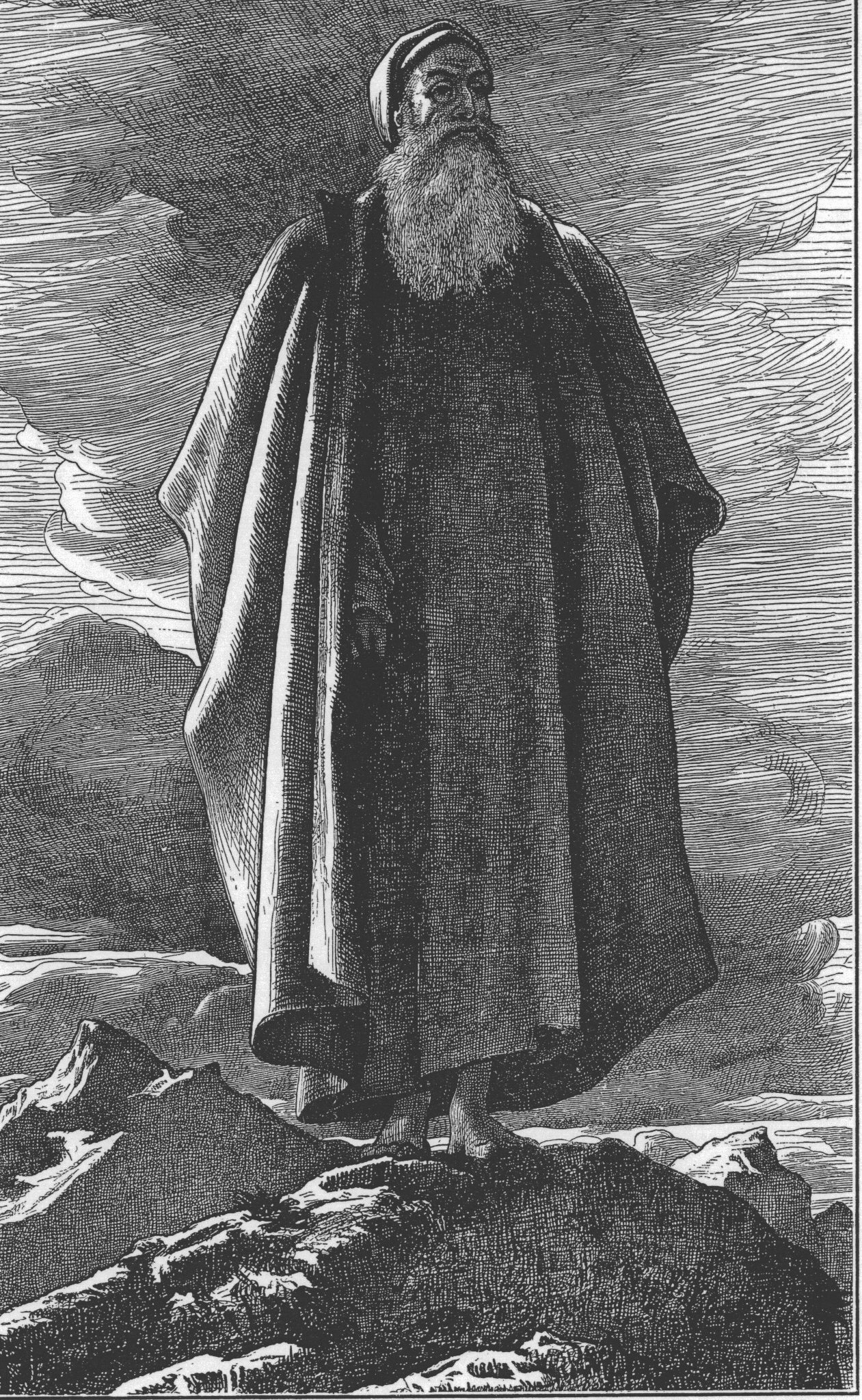
Moses views the Promised Land (by Lord Frederic Leighton, from the 1881 Illustrations for "Dalziel's Bible Gallery")

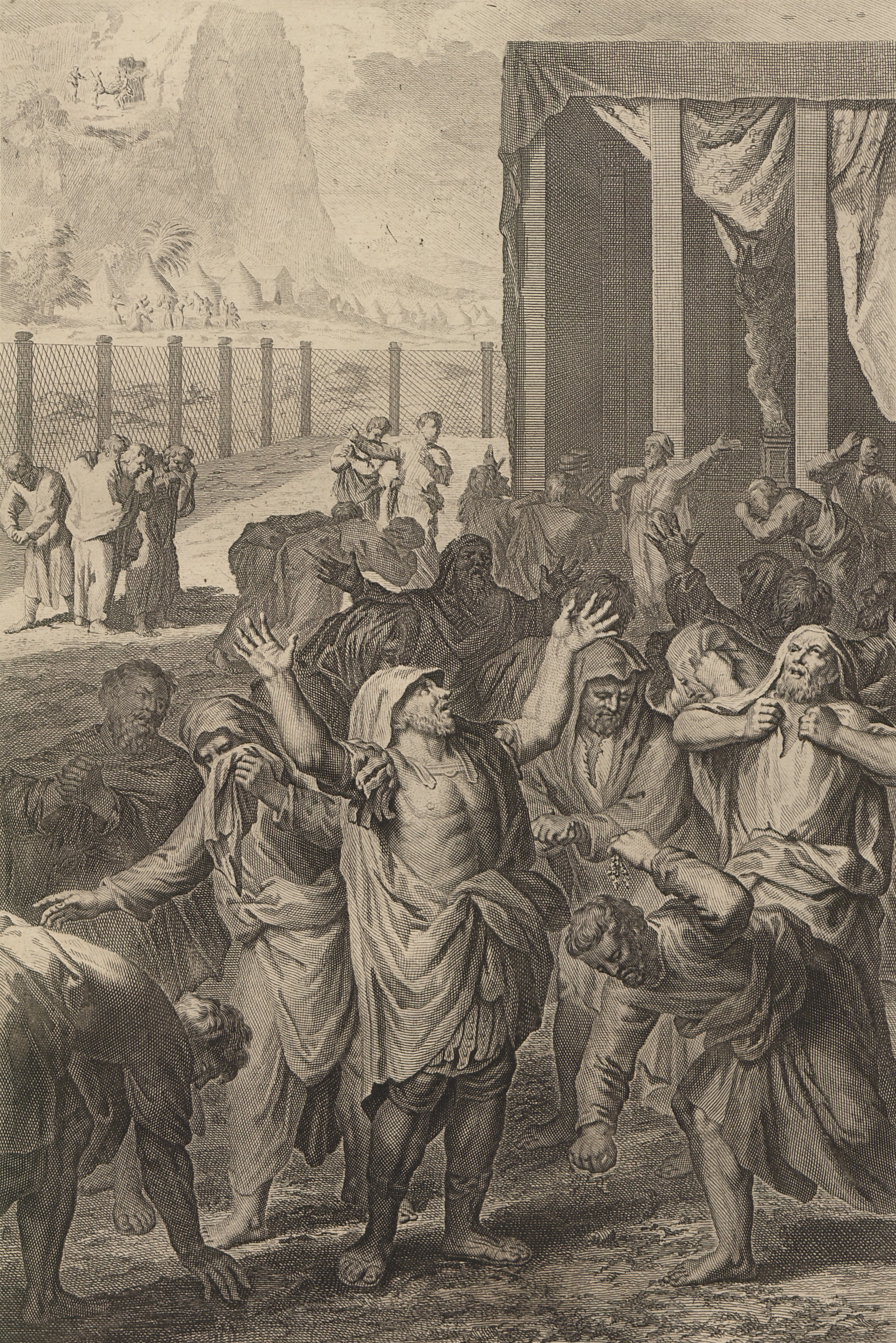
The Israelites Mourn for Moses (illustration from the 1728 Figures de la Bible)

The Mishnah and Tosefta cited Deuteronomy 34:6 for the proposition that Providence treats a person measure for measure as that person treats others. And so because, as Exodus 13:19 relates, Moses attended to Joseph's bones, so in turn, none but God attended him, as Deuteronomy 34:6 reports that God buried Moses. The Tosefta deduced that Moses was thus borne on the wings of God's Presence from the portion of Reuben (where the Tosefta deduced from Deuteronomy 32:49 that Moses died on Mount Nebo) to the portion of Gad (where the Tosefta deduced from the words "there a portion of a ruler was reserved" in Deuteronomy 33:21 that Moses was buried).

Rabbi Hama son of Rabbi Hanina taught that Deuteronomy 34:6 demonstrates one of God's attributes that humans should emulate. Rabbi Hama son of Rabbi Hanina asked what Deuteronomy 13:5 means in the text, "You shall walk after the Lord your God." How can a human being walk after God, when Deuteronomy 4:24 says, "[T]he Lord your God is a devouring fire"? Rabbi Hama son of Rabbi Hanina said that the command to walk after God means to walk after the attributes of God. As God clothes the naked—for Genesis 3:21 says, "And the Lord God made for Adam and for his wife coats of skin and clothed them"—so should we also clothe the naked. God visited the sick—for Genesis 18:1 says, "And the Lord appeared to him by the oaks of Mamre" (after Abraham was circumcised in Genesis 17:26)—so should we also visit the sick. God comforted mourners—for Genesis 25:11 says, "And it came to pass after the death of Abraham, that God blessed Isaac his son"—so should we also comfort mourners. God buried the dead—for Deuteronomy 34:6 says, "And He buried him in the valley"—so should we also bury the dead. Similarly, the Sifre on Deuteronomy 11:22 taught that to walk in God's ways means to be (in the words of Exodus 34:6) "merciful and gracious."

The Mishnah taught that some say the miraculous burial place of Moses—the location of which Deuteronomy 34:6 reports no one knows to this day—was created on the eve of the first Sabbath at twilight.

Rabbi Simlai taught that the Torah begins and ends with acts of kindness. Its beginning is an act of kindness, as Genesis 3:21 reports, "And the Lord God made for Adam and for his wife garments of skin and clothed them." And its end is an act of kindness, as Deuteronomy 34:6 tells, "And he was buried in the valley in the land of Moab."

A midrash read Deuteronomy 34:7, "His eye was not dim, nor his natural force abated," to teach that the radiant countenance that God had given Moses still remained with him.

The Tosefta deduced from Deuteronomy 34:8 and Joshua 1:1–2, 1:10–11 (in the haftarah for the parashah), and 4:19 that Moses died on the seventh of Adar.

== In modern interpretation ==
The parashah is discussed in these modern sources:

=== Deuteronomy chapter 33 ===
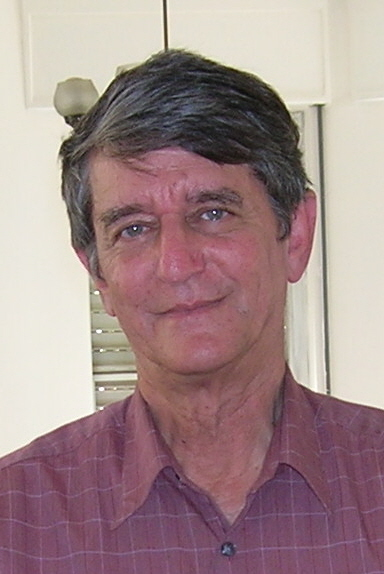
Kugel

James Kugel reported that some modern scholars see Moses's blessing of the tribes in Deuteronomy 33 to be of a different, arguably quite ancient, provenance than the rest of Deuteronomy, and that an editor tacked Deuteronomy 33 on to round out the book.

Noting the absence of Simeon from Deuteronomy 33, Kugel said that some see a midcourse correction in Israel's list of tribes in Jacob's adoption of Ephraim and Manasseh in Genesis 48:1–6. That there were 12 tribes seems to have become unchangeable at an early stage of Israel's history, perhaps because of the number of lunar months in a year. But, at some point, Simeon disappeared. So to compensate for its absence, the Israelites counted the territory elsewhere attributed to Joseph as two territories, each with its own ancestor figure. And thus, the tribal list in Deuteronomy 33 could omit the Simeonites and, by replacing Joseph with Ephraim and Manasseh, still include the names of 12 tribes.

Kugel saw a conflict over eligibility for the priesthood between the Priestly Source (abbreviated P) in Numbers 3:5–10 and the Deuteronomist (abbreviated D) in Deuteronomy 33:10. Kugel reported that scholars note that P spoke about "the priests, Aaron's sons," because, as far as P was concerned, the only legitimate priests descended from Aaron. P did speak of the Levites as another group of hereditary Temple officials, but according to P, the Levites had a different status: They could not offer sacrifices or perform the other crucial jobs assigned to priests but served Aaron's descendants as helpers. D, on the other hand, never talked about Aaron's descendants as special, but referred to "the Levitical priests." Kugel reported that many modern scholars interpreted this to mean that D believed that any Levite was a proper priest and could offer sacrifices and perform other priestly tasks, and this may have been the case for some time in Israel. Kugel said that when Moses blessed the tribe of Levi at the end of his life in Deuteronomy 33:10, he said: "Let them teach to Jacob Your ordinances, and to Israel Your laws; may they place incense before You, and whole burnt offerings on Your altar." And placing incense and whole burnt offerings before God were the quintessential priestly functions. Kugel reported that many scholars believe that Deuteronomy 33:10 dated to a far earlier era and thus may thus may indicate that all Levites had been considered fit priests at a very early time.

=== Deuteronomy chapter 34 ===
Patrick D. Miller argued that an implicit reason for the death of Moses outside the land is that his work was truly done: The people from then on were to live by the Torah and thus no longer needed Moses.

Diagram of the Documentary Hypothesis

== In critical analysis ==
Some scholars who follow the Documentary Hypothesis find evidence of three separate sources in the parashah. Thus some scholars consider the account of the death of Moses in Deuteronomy 34:5–7 to have been composed by the Jahwist (sometimes abbreviated J) who wrote possibly as early as the 10th century BCE. Some scholars attribute the account of mourning for Moses in Deuteronomy 34:8–9 to the Priestly source who wrote in the 6th or 5th century BCE. And then these scholars attribute the balance of the parashah, Deuteronomy 33:1–34:4 and Deuteronomy 34:10–12 to the first Deuteronomistic historian (sometimes abbreviated Dtr 1) who wrote shortly before the time of King Josiah. These scholars surmise that this first Deuteronomistic historian took the Blessing of Moses, Deuteronomy 33, from an old, separate source and inserted it here.

== Commandments ==
According to Maimonides and the Sefer ha-Chinuch, there are no commandments in the parashah.

== In the liturgy ==
Jews call on God to restore God's sovereignty in Israel, reflected in Deuteronomy 33:5, with the words "reign over us" in the weekday Amidah prayer in each of the three prayer services.

Some Jews read the words "he executed the righteousness of the Lord, and His ordinances with Israel" from Deuteronomy 33:21 as they study chapter 5 of Pirkei Avot on a Sabbath between Passover and Rosh Hashanah.

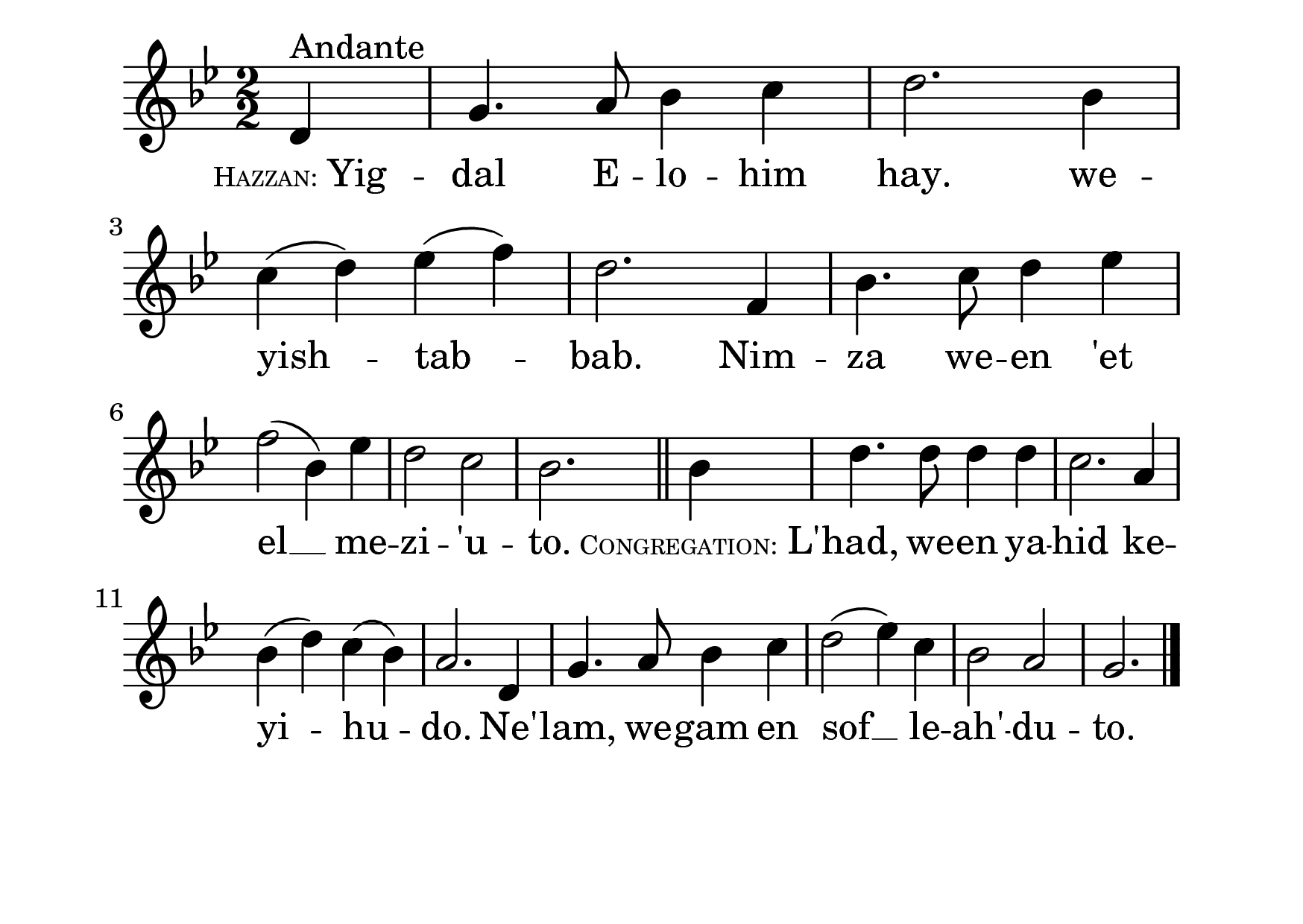
Myer Lyon's version of Yigdal

Some Jews sing words from Deuteronomy 33:29, "the shield of Your help, and that is the sword of Your excellency! And Your enemies shall dwindle away before You; and You shall tread upon their high places," as part of verses of blessing to conclude the Sabbath.

In the Yigdal hymn, the seventh verse, "In Israel, none like Moses arose again, a prophet who perceived His vision clearly," derives from the observation of Deuteronomy 34:10 that "there has not arisen a prophet since in Israel like Moses, whom the Lord knew face to face."

== The Weekly Maqam ==
In the Weekly Maqam, Sephardi Jews each week base the songs of the services on the content of that week's parashah. For Parashah V'Zot HaBerachah, which falls on the holiday Simchat Torah, Sephardi Jews apply Maqam Ajam, the maqam that expresses happiness, commemorating the joy of finishing the Torah readings, and beginning the cycle again.

== Haftarah ==
The haftarah for the parashah is:

- for Ashkenazi Jews: Joshua 1:1–18;
- for Sephardi Jews: Joshua 1:1–9.

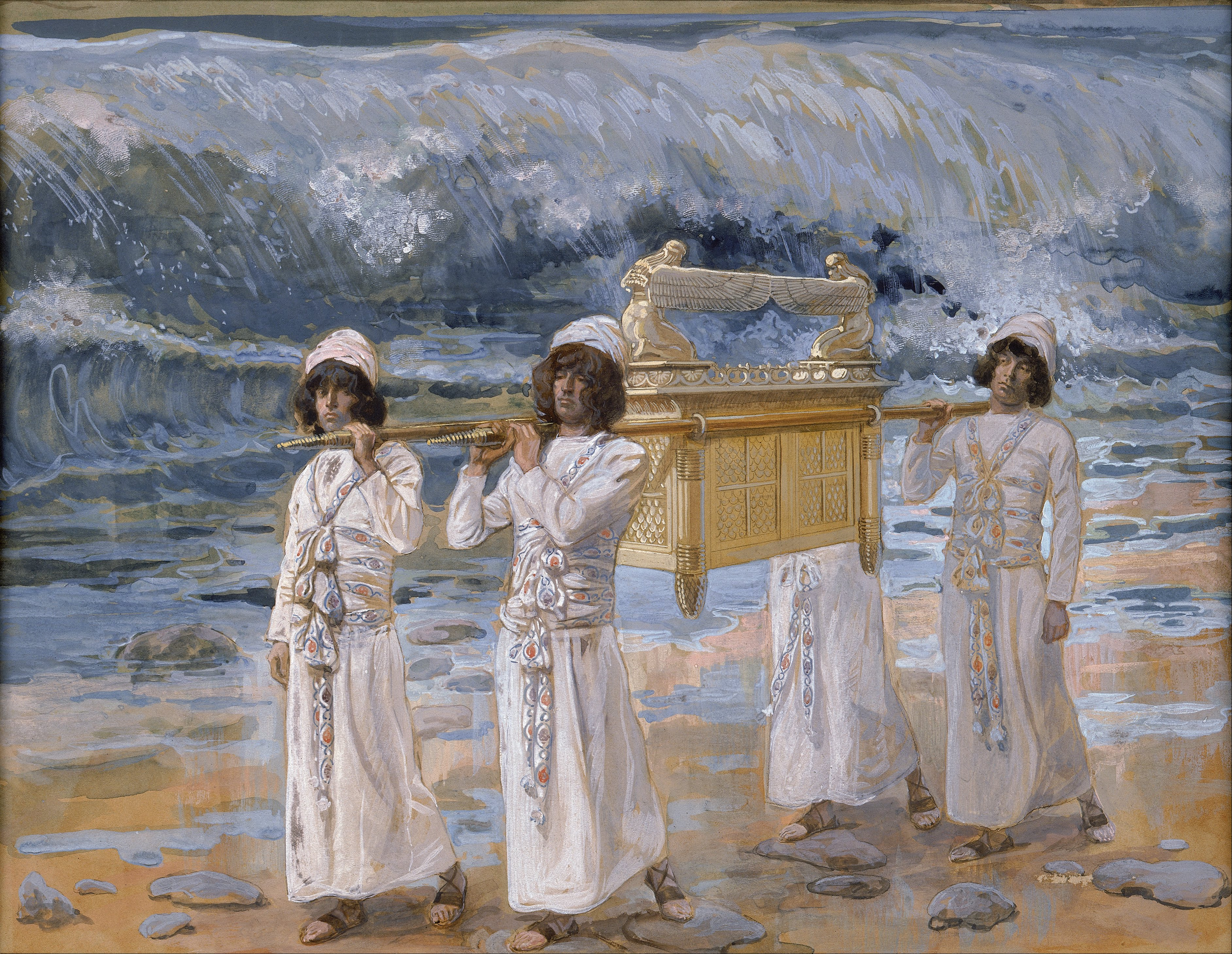
The Ark Passes Over the Jordan (watercolor circa 1896–1902 by James Tissot)

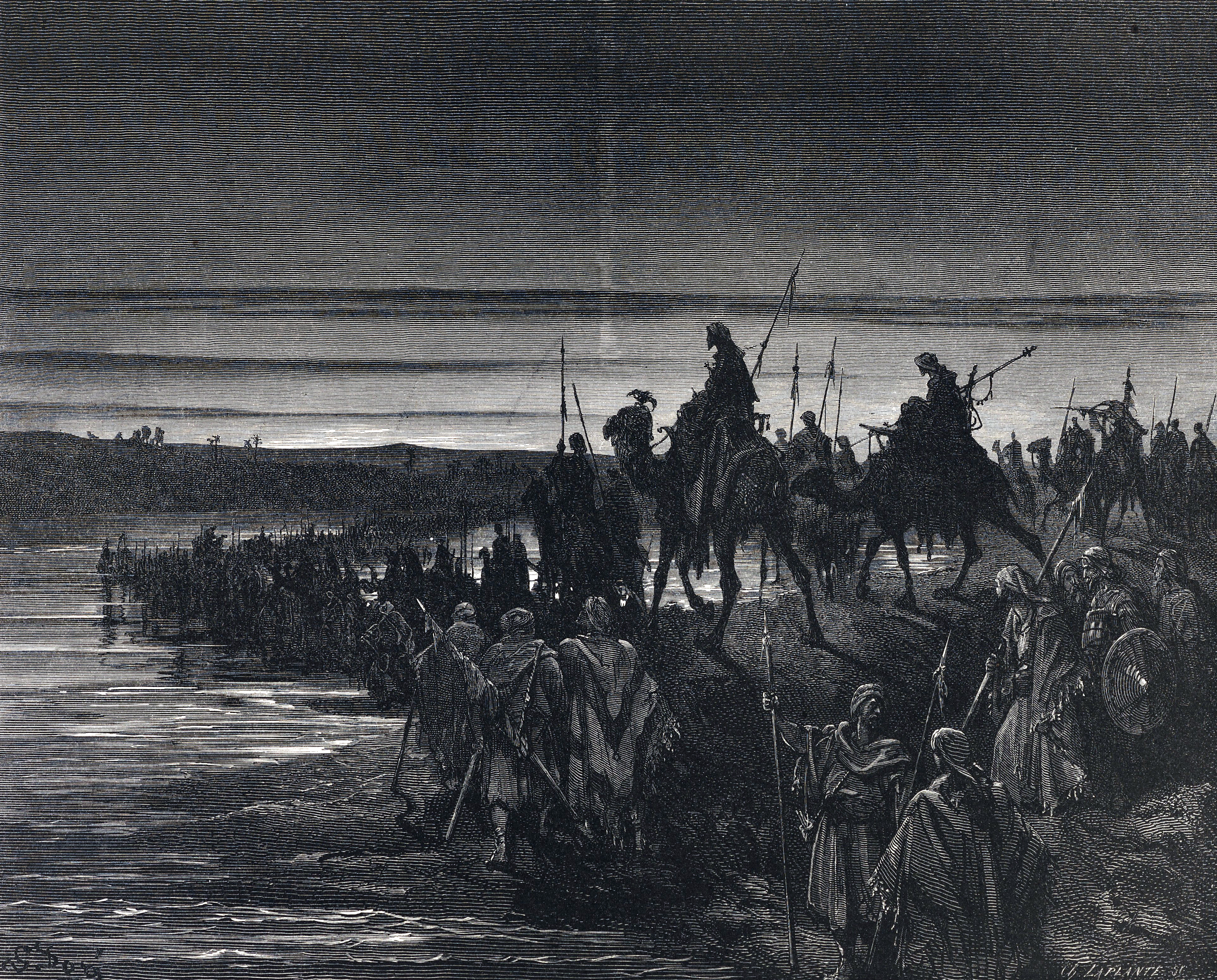
The Children of Israel Crossing the Jordan (illustration by Gustave Doré)

=== Summary of the haftarah ===
After Moses' death, God told Moses' minister Joshua to cross the Jordan with the Israelites. God would give them every place on which Joshua stepped, from the Negev desert to Lebanon, from the Euphrates to the Mediterranean Sea. God enjoined Joshua to be strong and of good courage, for none would be able to stand in his way, as God would lead him all of his life. God exhorted Joshua strictly to observe God's law, and to meditate on it day and night, so that he might succeed.

Joshua told his officers to have the Israelites prepare food, for within three days they were to cross the Jordan to possess the land that God was giving them. Joshua told the Reubenites, the Gadites, and the half-tribe of Manasseh to remember their commitment to Moses, whereby God would give them their land on the east side of the Jordan and their wives, children, and cattle would stay there, but the men would fight at the forefront of the Israelites until God gave the Israelites the land of Israel. They answered Joshua that they would follow his commands just as they had followed Moses. Whoever rebelled against Joshua's command would be put to death.

=== Connection between the haftarah and the parashah ===
The haftarah carries forward the story in the parashah. As the parashah concludes the Torah, the haftarah begins the Prophets. The parashah (in Deuteronomy 33:4) reports that "Moses commanded us a law" (תּוֹרָה צִוָּה-לָנוּ, מֹשֶׁה, Torah tzivah-lanu Mosheh), and in the haftarah (in Joshua 1:7), God told Joshua to observe "the law that Moses . . . commanded you" (הַתּוֹרָה—אֲשֶׁר צִוְּךָ מֹשֶׁה, Torah asher tzivcha Mosheh). While in the parashah (in Deuteronomy 34:4), God told Moses that he "shall not cross over" (לֹא תַעֲבֹר, lo ta'avor), in the haftarah (in Joshua 1:2), God told Joshua to "cross over" (עֲבֹר, avor). The parashah (in Deuteronomy 34:5) and the haftarah (in Joshua 1:1 and 1:13) both call Moses the "servant of the Lord" (עֶבֶד-יְהוָה, eved-Adonai). And the parashah (in Deuteronomy 34:5) and the haftarah (in Joshua 1:1–2) both report the death of Moses.

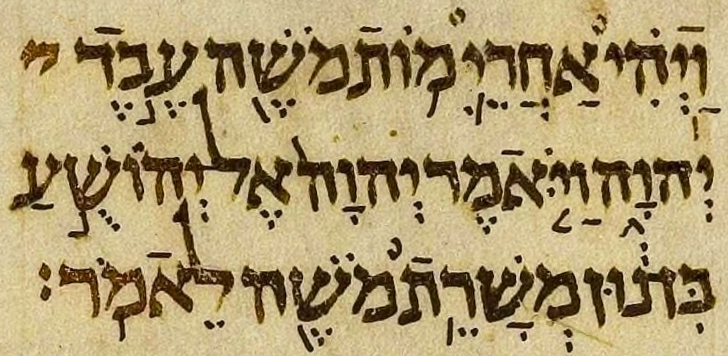
Joshua 1:1 in the Aleppo Codex

=== The haftarah in inner-Biblical interpretation ===
The characterization of Joshua as Moses's "assistant" (מְשָׁרֵת, mesharet) in Joshua 1:1 echoes Exodus 24:13 ("his assistant," מְשָׁרְתוֹ, mesharto), Exodus 33:11 ("his assistant," מְשָׁרְתוֹ, mesharto), and Numbers 11:28 (Moses's "assistant," מְשָׁרֵת, mesharet). God charged Moses to commission Joshua in Numbers 27:15–23.

God's reference to Moses as "my servant" (עַבְדִּי, avdi) in Joshua 1:2 and 1:7 echoes God's application of the same term to Abraham, Moses, and Caleb. And later, God used the term to refer to Moses David, Isaiah, Eliakim the son of Hilkiah, Israel, Nebuchadnezzar, Zerubbabel, the Branch, and Job,

God's promise in Joshua 1:3 to give Joshua "every spot on which your foot treads" echoes the same promise by Moses to the Israelites in Deuteronomy 11:24. And God's promise to Joshua in Joshua 1:5 that "no man shall be able to stand before you" echoes the same promise by Moses to the Israelites in Deuteronomy 11:25.

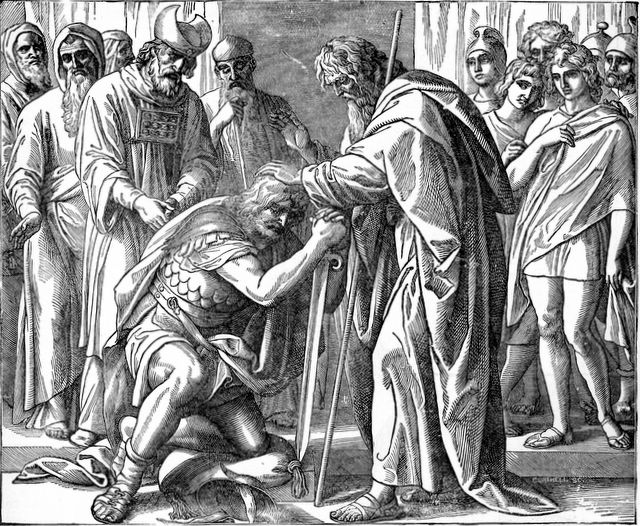
Moses Appoints Joshua (illustration from Henry Davenport Northrop's 1894 Treasures of the Bible)

God's encouragement to Joshua to be "strong and resolute" (חֲזַק, וֶאֱמָץ, chazak ve-ematz) in Joshua 1:6 is repeated by God to Joshua in Joshua 1:7 and 1:9 and by the Reubenites, Gadites, and the half-tribe of Manasseh to Joshua in Joshua 1:18. These exhortations echo the same encouragement that Moses gave the Israelites (in the plural) in Deuteronomy 31:6 and that Moses gave Joshua in Deuteronomy 31:7 and 31:23. Note also God's instruction to Moses to "charge Joshua, and encourage him, and strengthen him" in Deuteronomy 3:28. And later Joshua exhorted the Israelites to be "strong and resolute" (in the plural) in Joshua 10:25 and David encouraged his son and successor Solomon with the same words in 1 Chronicles 22:13 and 28:20.

God's admonishes Joshua in Joshua 1:7–8: "to observe to do according to all the law, which Moses My servant commanded you; turn not from it to the right hand or to the left, that you may have good success wherever you go. This book of the law shall not depart out of your mouth, but you shall meditate therein day and night, that you may observe to do according to all that is written therein; for then you shall make your ways prosperous, and then you shall have good success." This admonition echoes the admonition of Moses in Deuteronomy 17:18–20 that the king: "shall write him a copy of this law in a book . . . . And it shall be with him, and he shall read therein all the days of his life; that he may learn . . . to keep all the words of this law and these statutes, to do them; . . . and that he turn not aside from the commandment, to the right hand, or to the left; to the end that he may prolong his days in his kingdom, he and his children, in the midst of Israel."

In Joshua 1:13–15, Joshua reminded the Reubenites, Gadites, and the half-tribe of Manasseh of their commitment to fight for the Land of Israel using language very similar to that in Deuteronomy 3:18–20. Note also the account in Numbers 32:16–27. And the Reubenites, Gadites, and the half-tribe of Manasseh affirm their commitment with the same verbs in Joshua 1:16–17 ("we will do . . . so will we obey," נַעֲשֶׂה . . . נִשְׁמַע, na'aseh . . . nishmah) with which the Israelites affirmed their fealty to God in Exodus 24:7 ("will we do, and obey," נַעֲשֶׂה וְנִשְׁמָע, na'aseh ve-nishmah).

In Joshua 1:14, Joshua directed the Reubenites, Gadites, and the half-tribe of Manasseh that "you shall pass over before your brethren armed, all the mighty men of valor, and shall help them." Previously, in Numbers 26:2, God directed Moses and Eleazer to "take the sum of all the congregation of the children of Israel, from 20 years old and upward, . . . all that are able to go forth to war in Israel." That census yielded 43,730 men for Reuben, 40,500 men for Gad, and 52,700 men for Manasseh—for a total of 136,930 adult men "able to go forth to war" from the three tribes. But Joshua 4:12–13 reports that "about 40,000 ready armed for war passed on in the presence of the Lord to battle" from Reuben, Gad, and the half-tribe of Manasseh—or fewer than 3 in 10 of those counted in Numbers 26. Chida said that only the strongest participated, as Joshua asked in Joshua 1:14 for only "the mighty men of valor." Kli Yakar suggested that more than 100,000 men crossed over the Jordan to help, but when they saw the miracles at the Jordan, many concluded that God would ensure the Israelites' success and they were not needed.

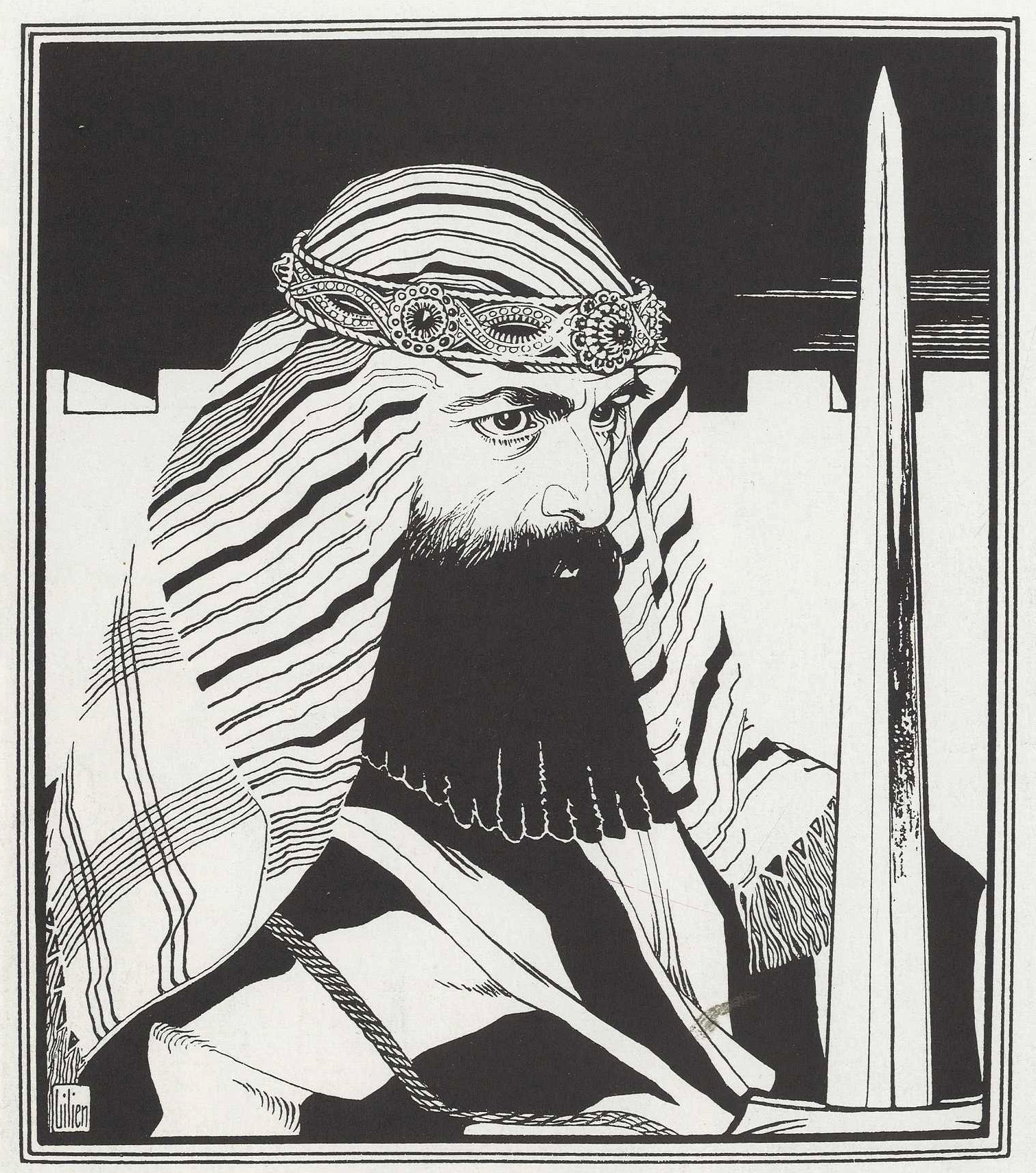
Joshua (1908 illustration by Ephraim Moses Lilien)

=== The haftarah in classical Rabbinic interpretation ===
A baraita taught that Joshua wrote the book of Joshua. Noting that Joshua 24:29 says, "And Joshua son of Nun the servant of the Lord died," the Gemara (reasoning that Joshua could not have written those words and the accounts thereafter) taught that Eleazar the High Priest completed the last five verses of the book. But then the Gemara also said that the final verse, Joshua 24:33, says, "And Eleazar the son of Aaron died," and concluded that Eleazar's son Phinehas finished the book.

Rav Judah taught in the name of Rav that upon the death of Moses, God directed Joshua in Joshua 1:1–2 to start a war to distract the Israelites' attention from the leadership transition. Rav Judah reported in the name of Rav that when Moses was dying, he invited Joshua to ask him about any doubts that Joshua might have. Joshua replied by asking Moses whether Joshua had ever left Moses for an hour and gone elsewhere. Joshua asked Moses whether Moses had not written in Exodus 33:11, "The Lord would speak to Moses face to face, as one man speaks to another. . . . But his servant Joshua the son of Nun departed not out of the Tabernacle." Joshua's words wounded Moses, and immediately the strength of Moses waned, and Joshua forgot 300 laws, and 700 doubts concerning laws arose in Joshua's mind. The Israelites then arose to kill Joshua (unless he could resolve these doubts). God then told Joshua that it was not possible to tell him the answers (for, as Deuteronomy 30:11–12 tells, the Torah is not in Heaven). Instead, God then directed Joshua to occupy the Israelites' attention in war, as Joshua 1:1–2 reports.

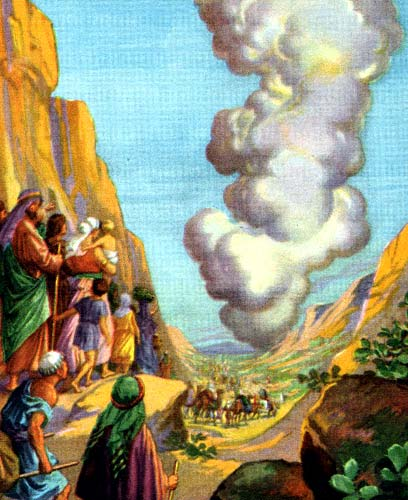
The Pillar of Cloud (illustration from a Bible card published circa 1896–1913 by the Providence Lithograph Company)

The Gemara taught that God's instruction to Moses in Numbers 27:20 to put some of his honor on Joshua was not to transfer all of the honor of Moses. The elders of that generation compared the countenance of Moses to that of the sun and the countenance of Joshua to that of the moon. The elders considered it a shame and a reproach that there had been such a decline in the stature of Israel's leadership in the course of just one generation.

Rabbi Yosé the son of Rabbi Judah said that after the death of Moses (reported in Deuteronomy 34:5 and Joshua 1:1), the pillar of cloud, the manna, and the well ceased. Rabbi Yosé the son of Rabbi Judah taught that when the Israelites left Egypt, Providence appointed three good providers for them: Moses, Aaron, and Miriam. On their account, Providence gave the Israelites three gifts: the pillar of cloud of the Divine Glory, manna, and the well that followed them throughout their sojourns. Providence provided the well through the merit of Miriam, the pillar of cloud through the merit of Aaron, and the manna through the merit of Moses. When Miriam died, the well ceased, but it came back through the merit of Moses and Aaron. When Aaron died, the pillar of cloud ceased, but both came back through the merit of Moses. When Moses died, all three of them came to an end and never came back, as Zechariah 11:8 says, "In one month, I destroyed the three shepherds." Similarly, Rabbi Simon taught that wherever it says, "And it came to pass after," the world relapsed into its former state. Thus, Joshua 1:1 says: "Now it came to pass after the death of Moses the servant of the Lord," and immediately thereafter, the well, the manna, and the clouds of glory ceased.

A midrash taught that Joshua 1:1 includes the words Moses's attendant to instruct that God gave Joshua the privilege of prophecy as a reward for his serving Moses as his attendant.

A midrash read Joshua 1:3 to promise the Children of Israel not only the Land of Israel (among many privileges and obligations especially for Israel), but all its surrounding lands, as well.

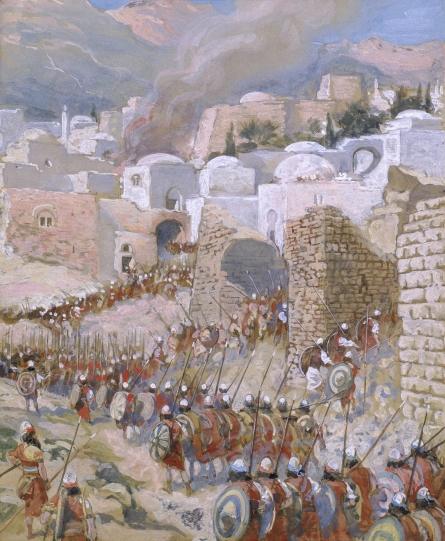
The Taking of Jericho (watercolor circa 1896–1902 by James Tissot)

A midrash taught that Genesis 15:18, Deuteronomy 1:7, and Joshua 1:4 call the Euphrates "the Great River" because it encompasses the Land of Israel. The midrash said that at the creation of the world, the Euphrates was not designated "great." But it is called "great" because it encompasses the Land of Israel, which Deuteronomy 4:7 calls a "great nation." As a popular saying said, the king's servant is a king, and thus Scripture calls the Euphrates great because of its association with the great nation of Israel.

Noting that in Joshua 1:5, God told Joshua, "As I was with Moses, so I will be with you," the Rabbis asked why Joshua lived only 110 years (as reported in Joshua 24:29 and Judges 2:8) and not 120 years, as Moses did (as reported in Deuteronomy 34:7). The Rabbis said that when God told Moses in Numbers 31:2 to "avenge the children of Israel of the Midianites; afterward shall you be gathered to your people," Moses did not delay carrying out the order, even though God told Moses that he would die thereafter. Rather, Moses acted promptly, as Numbers 31:6 reports: "And Moses sent them." When God directed Joshua to fight against the 31 kings, however, Joshua thought that if he killed them all at once, he would die immediately thereafter, as Moses had. So Joshua dallied in the wars against the Canaanites, as Joshua 11:18 reports: "Joshua made war a long time with all those kings." In response, God shortened his life by ten years.

The Rabbis taught in a baraita that four things require constant application of energy: (1) Torah study, (2) good deeds, (3) prayer, and (4) one's worldly occupation. In support of the first two, the baraita cited God's injunction in Joshua 1:7: "Only be strong and very courageous to observe to do according to all the law that My servant Moses enjoined upon you." The Rabbis deduced that one must "be strong" in Torah and "be courageous" in good deeds. In support of the need for strength in prayer, the Rabbis cited Psalm 27:14: "Wait for the Lord, be strong and let your heart take courage, yea, wait for the Lord." And in support of the need for strength in work, the Rabbis cited 2 Samuel 10:12: "Be of good courage, and let us prove strong for our people."

The admonition of Joshua 1:8 provoked the Rabbis to debate whether one should perform a worldly occupation in addition to studying Torah. The Rabbis in a baraita questioned what was to be learned from the words of Deuteronomy 11:14: "And you shall gather in your corn and wine and oil." Rabbi Ishmael replied that since Joshua 1:8 says, "This book of the law shall not depart out of your mouth, but you shall meditate therein day and night," one might think that one must take this injunction literally (and study Torah every waking moment). Therefore, Deuteronomy 11:14 directs one to "gather in your corn," implying that one should combine Torah study with a worldly occupation. Rabbi Simeon ben Yohai questioned that, however, asking if a person plows in plowing season, sows in sowing season, reaps in reaping season, threshes in threshing season, and winnows in the season of wind, when would one find time for Torah? Rather, Rabbi Simeon ben Yohai taught that when Israel performs God's will, others perform its worldly work, as Isaiah 61:5–6 says, "And strangers shall stand and feed your flocks, aliens shall be your plowmen and vine-trimmers; while you shall be called 'Priests of the Lord,' and termed 'Servants of our God.'" And when Israel does not perform God's will, it has to carry out its worldly work by itself, as Deuteronomy 11:14 says, "And you shall gather in your corn." And not only that, but the Israelites would also do the work of others, as Deuteronomy 28:48 says, "And you shall serve your enemy whom the Lord will let loose against you. He will put an iron yoke upon your neck until He has wiped you out." Abaye observed that many had followed Rabbi Ishmael's advice to combine secular work and Torah study and it worked well, while others have followed the advice of Rabbi Simeon ben Yohai to devote themselves exclusively to Torah study and not succeeded. Rava would ask the Rabbis (his disciples) not to appear before him during Nisan (when corn ripened) and Tishrei (when people pressed grapes and olives) so that they might not be anxious about their food supply during the rest of the year.

Rabbi Eleazar deduced from Joshua 1:8 that God created people to study Torah. Rabbi Eleazar deduced from Job 5:7, "Yet man is born for toil just as sparks fly upward," that all people are born to work. Rabbi Eleazar deduced from Proverbs 16:26, "The appetite of a laborer labors for him, for his mouth craves it of him," that Scripture means that people are born to toil by mouth—that is, study—rather than toil by hand. And Rabbi Eleazar deduced from Joshua 1:8, "This book of the Torah shall not depart out of your mouth, but you shall meditate therein day and night, that you may observe to do according to all that is written therein," that people were born to work in the Torah rather than in secular conversation. And this coincides with Rava's dictum that all human bodies are receptacles; happy are they who are worthy of being receptacles of the Torah.

Rabbi Joshua ben Levi said that the promise of Joshua 1:8 that whoever studies the Torah prospers materially is also written in the Torah and mentioned a third time in the Writings. In the Torah, Deuteronomy 29:8 says: "Observe therefore the words of this covenant, and do them, that you may make all that you do to prosper." It is repeated in the Prophets in Joshua 1:8, "This book of the Law shall not depart out of your mouth, but you shall meditate therein day and night, that you may observe to do according to all that is written therein; for then you shall make your ways prosperous, and then you shall have good success." And it is mentioned a third time in the Writings in Psalm 1:2–3, "But his delight is in the Law of the Lord, and in His Law does he meditate day and night. And he shall be like a tree planted by streams of water, that brings forth its fruit in its season, and whose leaf does not wither; and in whatever he does he shall prosper."

The Rabbis considered what one needs to do to fulfill the commandment of Joshua 1:8. Rabbi Jose interpreted the analogous term "continually" (תָּמִיד, tamid) in Exodus 25:30, which says "And on the table you shall set the bread of display, to be before [God] continually." Rabbi Jose taught that even if they took the old bread of display away in the morning and placed the new bread on the table only in the evening, they had honored the commandment to set the bread "continually." Rabbi Ammi analogized from this teaching of Rabbi Jose that people who learn only one chapter of Torah in the morning and one chapter in the evening have nonetheless fulfilled the precept of Joshua 1:8 that "this book of the law shall not depart out of your mouth, but you shall meditate therein day and night." Rabbi Joḥanan said in the name of Rabbi Simeon ben Yohai that even people who read just the Shema (Deuteronomy 6:4–9) morning and evening thereby fulfill the precept of Joshua 1:8. Rabbi Joḥanan taught that it is forbidden, however, to teach this to people who through ignorance are careless in the observance of the laws (as it might deter them from further Torah study). But Rava taught that it is meritorious to say it in their presence (as they might think that if merely reciting the Shema twice daily earns reward, how great would the reward be for devoting more time to Torah study).

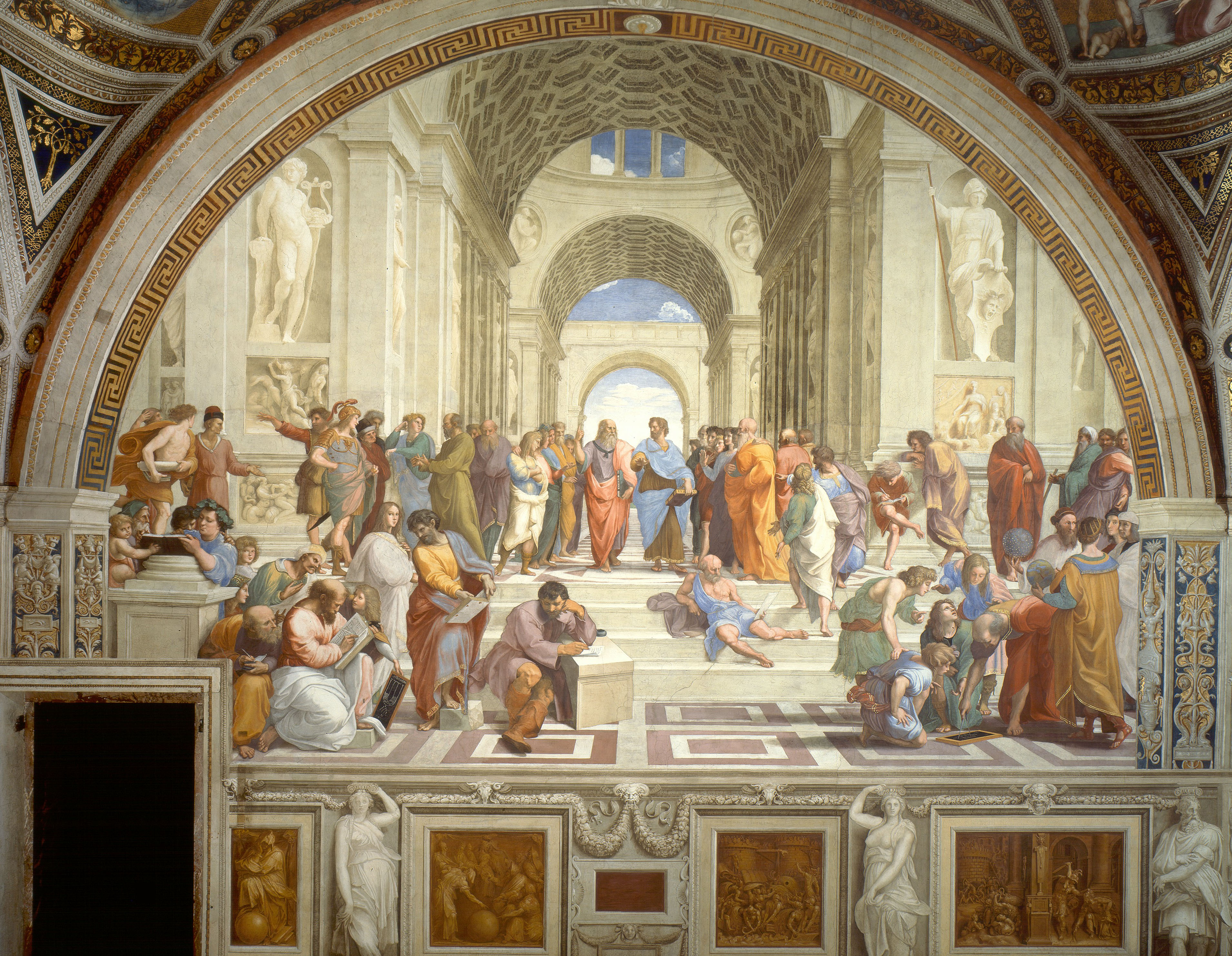
The School of Athens (1505 painting by Raphael)

Ben Damah the son of Rabbi Ishmael's sister once asked Rabbi Ishmael whether one who had studied the whole Torah might learn Greek wisdom. Rabbi Ishmael replied by reading to Ben Damah the verse Joshua 1:8, "This book of the law shall not depart out of your mouth, but you shall meditate therein day and night." And then Rabbi Ishmael told Ben Damah to go find a time that is neither day nor night and learn Greek wisdom then. Rabbi Samuel ben Naḥman, however, taught in the name of Rabbi Jonathan that Joshua 1:8 is neither duty nor command, but a blessing. For God saw that the words of the Torah were most precious to Joshua, as Exodus 33:11 says, "The Lord would speak to Moses face to face, as one man speaks to another. And he would then return to the camp. His minister Joshua, the son of Nun, a young man, departed not out of the tent." So God told Joshua that since the words of the Torah were so precious to him, God assured Joshua (in the words of Joshua 1:8) that "this book of the law shall not depart out of your mouth." A baraita was taught in the School of Rabbi Ishmael, however, that one should not consider the words of the Torah as a debt that one should desire to discharge, for one is not at liberty to desist from them.

Like Rabbi Ishmael, Rabbi Joshua also used Joshua 1:8 to warn against studying Greek philosophy. They asked Rabbi Joshua what the law was with regard to people teaching their children from books in Greek. Rabbi Joshua told them to teach Greek at the hour that is neither day nor night, as Joshua 1:8 says, "This book of the law shall not depart out of your mouth, and you will meditate therein day and night."

Rabbi Simeon ben Yohai taught that God used the words of Joshua 1:8–9 to bolster Joshua when Joshua fought the Amorites at Gibeon. Rabbi Simeon ben Yohai told that when God appeared to Joshua, God found Joshua sitting with the book of Deuteronomy in his hands. God told Joshua (using the words of Joshua 1:8–9) to be strong and of good courage, for the book of the law would not depart out of his mouth. Thereupon Joshua took the book of Deuteronomy and showed it to the sun and told the sun that even as Joshua had not stood still from studying the book of Deuteronomy, so the sun should stand still before Joshua. Immediately (as reported in Joshua 10:13), "The sun stood still."

The Tosefta reasoned that if God charged even the wise and righteous Joshua to keep the Torah near, then so much more so should the rest of us. The Tosefta said that Deuteronomy 34:9 says, "And Joshua the son of Nun was full of the spirit of wisdom, for Moses had laid his hand upon him," and Exodus 33:11 says, "The Lord would speak to Moses face to face, as one man speaks to another. And he would then return to the camp; and his minister, Joshua, the son of Nun, a young man, stirred not from the midst of the Tent." And yet in Joshua 1:8, God enjoined even Joshua: "This Book of the Torah shall not depart out of your mouth, but recite it day and night." The Tosefta concluded that all the more so should the rest of the people have and read the Torah.

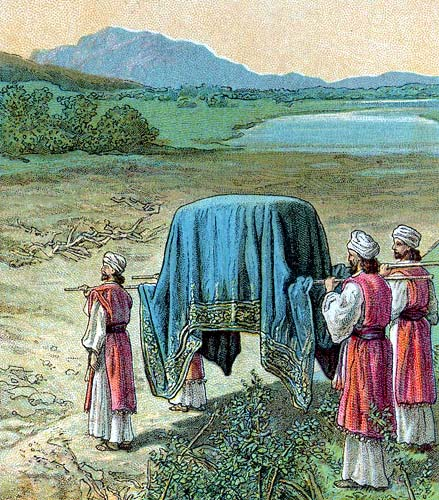
Israel Enters the Promised Land (illustration from a Bible card published by the Providence Lithograph Company)

Rabbi Berekiah, Rabbi Hiyya, and the Rabbis of Babylonia taught in Rabbi Judah's name that a day does not pass in which God does not teach a new law in the heavenly Court. For as Job 37:2 says, "Hear attentively the noise of His voice, and the meditation that goes out of His mouth." And meditation refers to nothing but Torah, as Joshua 1:8 says, "You shall meditate therein day and night."

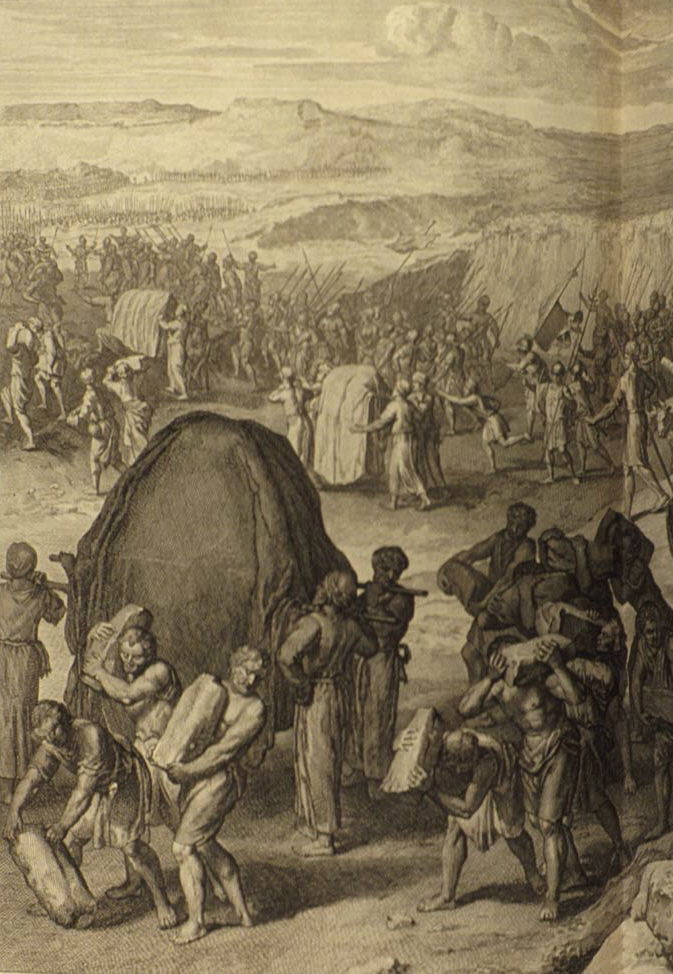
The Israelites Pass the River Jordan (illustration from the 1728 Figures de la Bible)

A midrash deduced from Joshua 1:11 and 4:17 that Israel neither entered nor left the Jordan without permission. The midrash said Ecclesiastes 10:4, "If the spirit of the ruler rise up against you, leave not your place," is about Joshua. The midrash said that just as the Israelites crossed the Jordan with permission, so they did not leave the Jordan River bed without permission. The midrash deduced that they crossed with permission from Joshua 1:11, in which God told Joshua, "Pass through the midst of the camp... for within three days you are to pass over this Jordan," and from Joshua 4:17: "Joshua therefore commanded the priests, saying: 'Come up out of the Jordan.'"

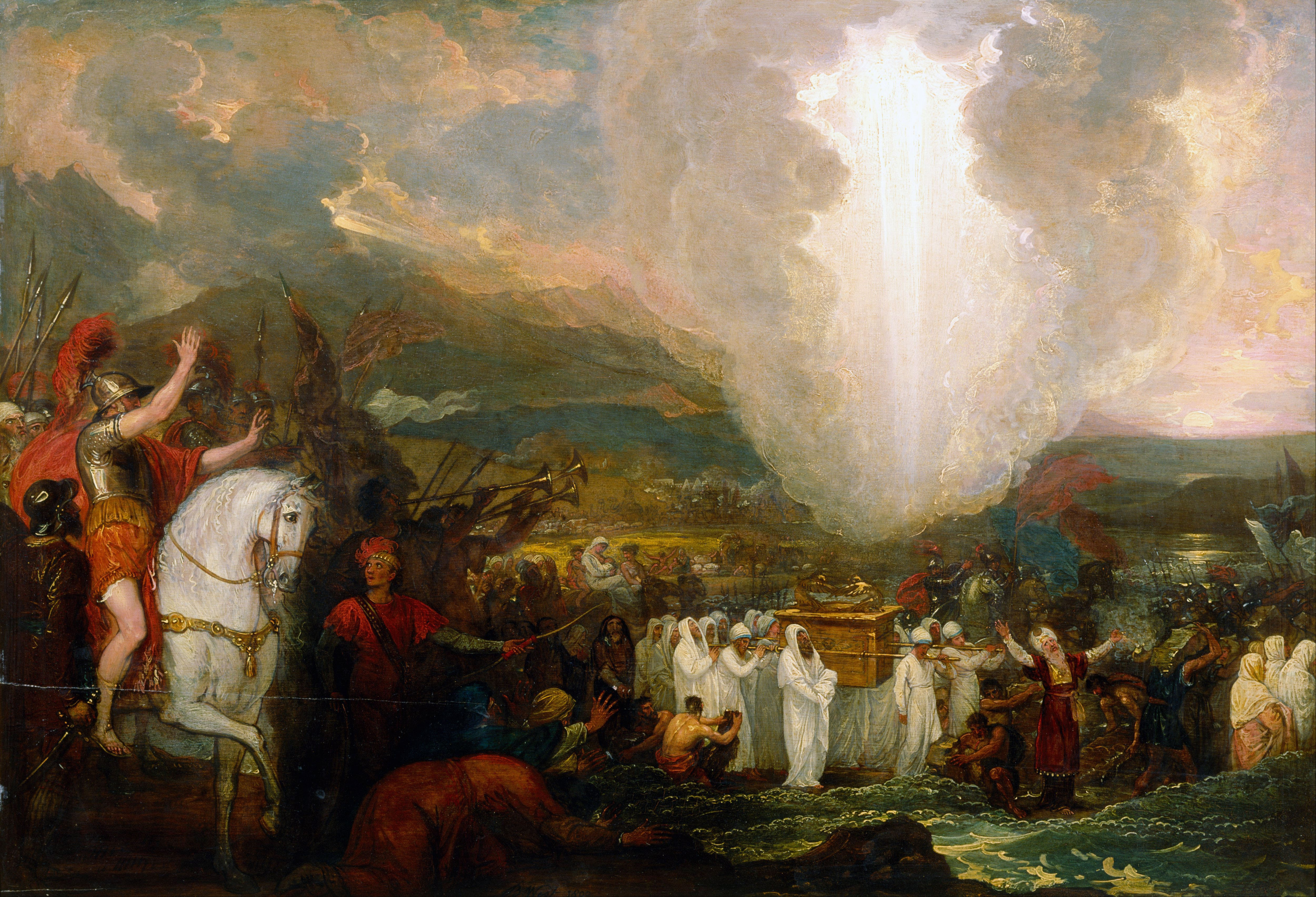
Joshua passing the River Jordan with the Ark of the Covenant (1800 painting by Benjamin West)

A midrash pictured the scene in Joshua 1:16 using the Song of Songs as an inspiration. The midrash said, "Your lips are like a thread of scarlet and your speech is comely," (in the words of Song of Songs 4:3) when the Reubenites, the Gadites, and the half-tribe of Manasseh said to Joshua (in Joshua 1:16), "All that you have commanded us we will do, and we will go wherever you send us."

The Gemara attributes to Solomon (or others say Benaiah) the view that the word only (רַק, rak) in Joshua 1:18 limited the application of the death penalty mandated by the earlier part of the verse. The Gemara tells how they brought Joab before the Court, and Solomon judged and questioned him. Solomon asked Joab why he killed Amasa (David's nephew, who commanded Absalom's rebel army). Joab answered that Amasa disobeyed the king's order (and thus under Joshua 1:18 should be put to death), when (as 2 Samuel 20:4–5 reports) King David told Amasa to call the men of Judah together within three days and report, but Amasa delayed longer than the time set for him. Solomon replied that Amasa interpreted the words but and only (אַך, ach and רַק, rak). Amasa found the men of Judah just as they had begun Talmudic study. Amasa recalled that Joshua 1:18 says, "Whoever rebels against [the King's] commandments and shall not hearken to your words in all that you command him, he shall be put to death." Now, one might have thought that this holds true even if the king were to command one to disregard the Torah. Therefore, Joshua 1:18 continues, "Only (רַק, rak) be strong and of good courage!" (And the word only (רַק, rak) implies a limitation on the duty to fulfill the king's command where it would run counter to Torah study.)
