= Hamnuna =

Hamnuna (Hebrew: המנונא) is the name of several rabbis from the period of the Talmud, among them:

- Hamnuna Saba ("the elder"). Second generation Babylonian amora (mid third century CE). A pupil of Rav. After Rav, he became the head of the rabbinical academy at Sura. The Talmud contains many halakhic rulings, aggadot and prayers from him. He was an associate of Rav Chisda.
- Hamnuna Saba (Zohar). According to the Zohar, a rabbi from the Land of Israel from the third generation of tannaim. He is never mentioned in the Mishnah or Talmud, but appears frequently in the Zohar.
- Hamnuna III. Third generation Babylonian amora. He grew up in Harpania and later moved to Harta of Argiz, near Baghdad. He also was a colleague of Rav Chisda, and was a pupil under Rabbi Judah and Ulla.
- Hamnuna IV. Fourth generation Babylonian amora, teacher of Rav Papa.
- Hamnuna Zuta ("the younger"), late fourth century CE. A confession prayer he was fond of reciting on Yom Kippur eventually became part of the Yom Kippur prayer service.

According to the Encyclopaedia Judaica, "Other amoraim of the same name, some with and some without appellations, who lived in the third and fourth centuries and whom it is difficult to identify, are referred to in the Talmudic sources."
