= Shimei ben Gera =

Biblical figure from the book of Samuel and Kings

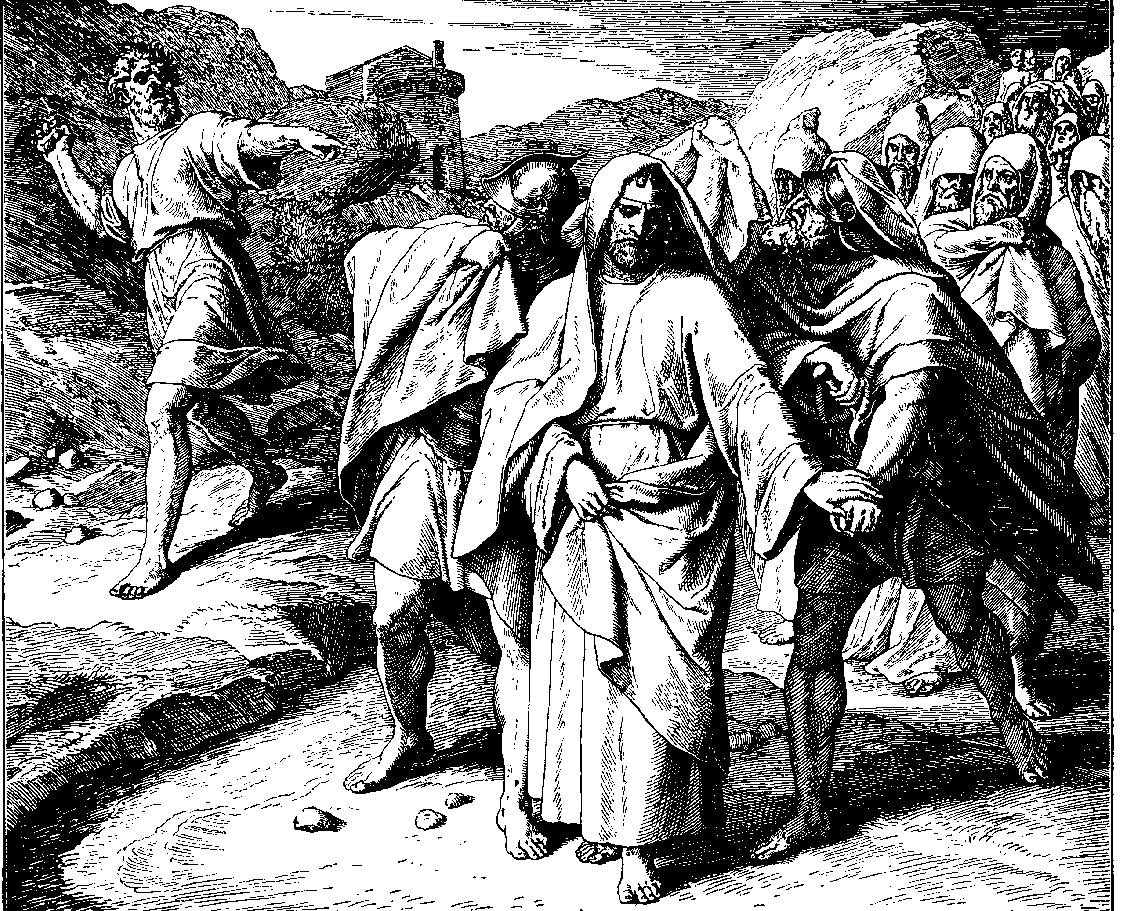
Shimei curses David. 1860 woodcut by Julius Schnorr von Carolsfeld

Shimei ben Gera is a Biblical figure from the Book of II Samuel and the Book of I Kings. He was from the tribe of Benjamin and was related to King Saul. II Samuel relates that when King David was fleeing from his son Absalom, Shimei cursed him as he passed through the village of Bahurim:

5. And when king David came to Bahurim, behold, there came out thence a man of the family of the house of Saul, whose name was Shimei, the son of Gera; he came out, and kept on cursing as he came. 6. And he cast stones at David, and at all the servants of king David; and all the people and all the mighty men were on his right hand and on his left. 7. And thus said Shimei when he cursed: 'Begone, begone, thou man of blood, and base fellow; 8. the Lord hath returned upon thee all the blood of the house of Saul, in whose stead thou hast reigned; and the Lord hath delivered the kingdom into the hand of Absalom thy son; and, behold, thou art taken in thine own mischief, because thou art a man of blood.'

Shimei's curse has been interpreted as referring to the killing of Abner ben Ner and the death of Ish-bosheth, King Saul's general and son. Alternatively, other interpretations attribute Shimei's animosity to David from the fact that he saw David as the one who removed Saul's family from the throne.

The Talmud says that Shimei cursed David because of his sin with Bathsheba, calling him an adulterer, a Moabite, a murderer, an oppressor, and an abomination.

Abishai ben Zeruiah, David's military leader, wanted to kill Shimei on the spot, but David did not permit him.

9. Then said Abishai the son of Zeruiah unto the king: 'Why should this dead dog curse my lord the king? let me go over, I pray thee, and take off his head.' 10. And the king said: 'What have I to do with you, ye sons of Zeruiah? So let him curse, because the Lord hath said unto him: Curse David; who then shall say: Wherefore hast thou done so?' 11. And David said to Abishai, and to all his servants: 'Behold, my son, who came forth of my body, seeketh my life; how much more this Benjamite now? let him alone, and let him curse; for the Lord hath bidden him. 12. It may be that the Lord will look on mine eye, and that the Lord will requite me good for his cursing of me this day.' 13. So David and his men went by the way; and Shimei went along on the hill-side over against him, and cursed as he went, and threw stones at him, and cast dust.

After David's army defeated Absalom's force, as he crossed back over the Jordan River to return to Jerusalem, Shimei came with about 1,000 men to ask him for forgiveness. Once again, Abishai asked permission to kill Shimei, but David forgave him. Some scholars attribute David's forgiveness to the desire to make peace with the Tribe of Benjamin.

According to Yalkut Shimoni, Shimei addressed David as follows: "The brothers of Joseph did him injury, but Joseph returned good for evil. Be thou as Joseph, and recompense me with good, though I dealt evilly with thee. It was not I alone but all Israel that entreated thee ill. They now await my fate, and if thou forgivest me, they will come and make peace with thee and surrender themselves to thee" (Yalḳ. ii. 151)

However, on his deathbed, David instructed his son Solomon to deal appropriately with Shimei and punish him for his actions.

Solomon followed his father's instructions. He ordered Shimei to move to Jerusalem and forbade him to leave the city on pain of death. For three years, Shimei obeyed the order and remained in Jerusalem, but after three years he left to pursue two slaves who escaped to the kingdom of Achish, king of Gath. When he returned to Jerusalem, Solomon had him put to death.

== In rabbinic Judaism ==
The Talmud records different opinions about Shimei. According to Rabbi Ḥiyya bar Ami citing Ulla, Shimei was Solomon's teacher. The Talmud further states that as long as Shimei was alive, Solomon refrained from marrying Pharaoh's daughter and other foreign wives. The statement instructs that this shows that a person should always live in the same place as his teacher.

In contrast, Midrash Rabba describes Shimei was wicked. He is listed alongside the wicked kings of Judah, Ahaz and Amon. All three were spared by God because of the righteous children who would be descended from them. According to this midrash, Mordecai was descended from Shimei. In Yalkut Shimoni it states that the reason David did not kill Shimei was that he was with the Holy Spirit that Mordechai would come from him and would save the Jewish people.

In Midrash Shmuel and Yalkut Shimoni it is the merit of Shimei's wife that saved Shimei and Mordechai, and by extension the Jews of Persia from Haman's decrees. These midrashim relate that she hid and protected Jonathan ben Abiathar and Ahimaaz ben Zadok when they had been sent by Hushai the Archite to tell David of Absalom's plans and were being pursued by the rebellious king's men.

Rashi writes that Shimei ben Gera was the head of the Sanhedrin.

== In Josephus ==
Josephus includes the story of David and Shimei in his Antiquities of the Jews, putting the following words in David's mouth:

"Let us not," said he, "bring upon ourselves another fresh misfortune to those we have already, for truly I have not the least regard nor concern for this dog that raves at me: I submit myself to God, by whose permission this man treats me in such a wild manner; nor is it any wonder that I am obliged to undergo these abuses from him, while I experience the like from an impious son of my own; but perhaps God will have some commiseration upon us; if it be his will we shall overcome them."

== In Christianity ==
The Nicene Fathers cite David's forgiveness of Shimei as a paradigm of restraining anger and of silence and humility.

== In popular culture ==
John Dryden caricatured the Sheriff of London, Slingsby Bethel, a political enemy of Charles II of England, under the name of Shimei in his Absalom and Achitophel (Part One, ll. 584-586):

The wretch, who Heav'n's Anointed dar'd to curse.
Shimei, whose youth did early promise bring
Of zeal to God, and hatred to his king...

Abraham Lincoln referred to David's forgiveness of Shimei when asked how he would deal with the South after the Civil War:

Judge Gillespie of Edwardsville, Ill. says: "I asked him [Lincoln] once what was to be done with the South after the Rebellion was put down. He said some thought their heads ought to come off; 'but,' said he, 'if it was left to me, I could not tell where to draw the line between those whose heads should come off and those whose heads should stay on.' He said that he had been recently reading the history of the rebellion of Absalom, and that he inclined to adopt the views of David. 'When David was fleeing from Jerusalem, Shimei cursed him. After the Rebellion was put down, Shimei craved a pardon. Abishai, David's nephew, the son of Zeruiah, David's sister, said: "This man ought not to be pardoned, because he cursed the Lord's anointed." David said: "What have I to do with you, ye sons of Zeruiah, that you should this day be adversaries unto me? Know ye that not a man shall be put to death in Israel.'"

Thomas Hardy referred to the incident in Far from the Madding Crowd:

"Cain, Cain, how can you!" asked Joseph sternly. "You be asked to swear in a holy manner, and you swear like wicked Shimei, the son of Gera, who cursed as he came. Young man, fie!"
