= Ḥiyya bar Ami =

3rd- and 4th-generation Bablyonian Amora

- חייא בר אמי

Personal life
- Born: 3rd century
- Died: 4th century Syria Palaestina
- Era: Third generation of amoraim

Religious life
- Religion: Judaism

Jewish leader
- Teacher: Ulla

Rav Hiyya bar Ami (Hebrew: חייא בר אמי) was a third- and fourth-generation Babylonian Amora.

== Biography ==
His main teacher was Ulla, but he also learned from Rav Chisda and Ḥulfana Seder HaDoroth questions whether his father was a Kohen or not.

One of his colleagues was Rav Yosef bar Hiyya. The Talmud cites a dispute between Rav Hiyya and Rav Yosef regarding the precise measure of a double sit that determines liability for one who whitens on Shabbat.

In several places the Talmud relates that Rav Nachman, Ulla and Avimi bar Pappi were sitting and discussing halakha amongst themselves while Hiyya bar Ami was sitting before them like a student before his teachers. Sometimes he would sit and discuss among them and give answers to their questions.

The Talmud says that Rav Hiyya bar Ami's slave once immersed a gentile woman in a mikveh so he could have relations with her (to purify her from her niddah status). The slave then married the woman and had a daughter with her. The Talmud discusses the status of the woman and her daughter, whether immersion for the sake of niddah is also effective for conversion to Judaism.

== Sayings ==
Most of Rav Hiyya bar Ami's statements are said in the name of Ulla and are in the realm of halacha. The following Aggadic statements of Rav Hiyya bar Ami in the name of Ulla all appear in Berakhot .

- Rabbi Hiyya bar Ami said in the name of Ulla: From the day the Temple was destroyed, the Holy One, blessed is He, has only four cubits of halacha.
- One who benefits from the toil of his hands is greater than one who fears Heaven. For regarding fear of Heaven, the verse states, "Fortunate is the man who fears God," whereas regarding one who benefits from the toil of his hands, the verse states, "When you eat the fruit of your labor you are fortunate and it is good for you." "Fortunate" means in this world. "Good for you" in the world to come. With regard to fear of Heaven it does not say "It will be good for you."
- A person should always live in the place of his teacher, for as long as Shimei ben Gera was alive, Solomon did not marry Pharaoh's daughter.
