= Kebra Nagast =

14th-century text about the Solomonic dynasty in Ethiopia

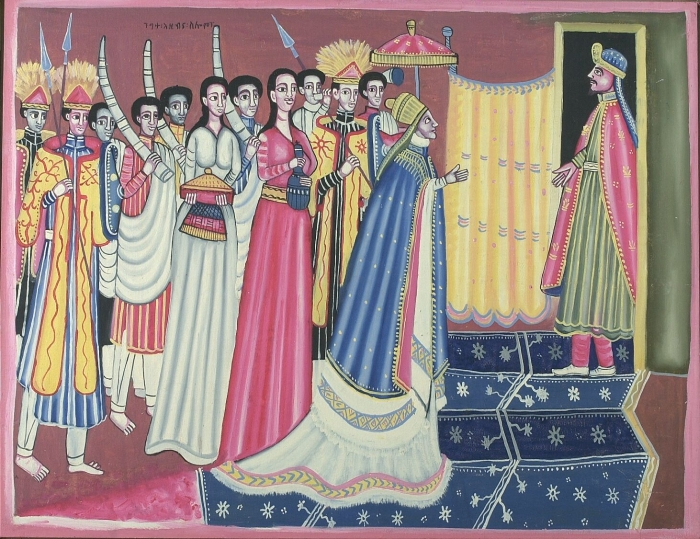
Illustration to the Kebra Nagast, between 1965 and 1975

The Kebra Nagast (Ge'ez: ክብረ ነገሥት, Kəbrä Nägäśt), or The Glory of the Kings, is a 14th-century national epic of Ethiopia, written in Geʽez by Nebure Id Yeshaq of Aksum. In its existing form, the text is at least 700 years old and purports to trace the origins of the Solomonic dynasty, a line of Ethiopian Orthodox Christian monarchs who ruled the country until 1974, to the biblical king, Solomon and the Queen of Sheba through Menelik I and thus how the Ethiopian Emperors purportedly descended from the Davidic line as did Jesus.

Modern scholarship considers its stories to have been largely created to legitimize the dynasty's rise to power in Ethiopia in the 13th century. Nevertheless, many Ethiopian Christians continue to believe it is a historically reliable work.

The text contains an account of how the Queen of Sheba (Queen Makeda of Ethiopia) met king Solomon of Israel and about how the Ark of the Covenant came to Ethiopia with their son Menelik I (Menyelek). It also discusses the conversion via missionaries of Ethiopians from the worship of the Sun, Moon, and stars to that of the "Lord God of Israel". As the Ethiopianist Edward Ullendorff explained in the 1967 Schweich Lectures, "The Kebra Nagast is not merely a literary work, but it is the repository of Ethiopian national and religious feelings".

It has been described as “an Abyssinian politico-religious epic” and "medieval-era mythology". Nadia Nurhussein wrote that "The Kebra Nagast gave textual authority to a then newly articulated mythology of Abyssinia’s long imperial history, legitimizing a “Solomonic” dynasty' that claimed to reach back three thousand years earlier to the union of King Solomon and the supposedly Ethiopian Queen of Sheba." It enabled the overthrow of the Zagwe Dynasty.

== Summary of contents ==
The Kebra Nagast is divided into 117 chapters, and is clearly a composite work; Ullendorff describes its narrative as "a gigantic conflation of legendary cycles". This account draws much of its material from the Hebrew Bible and the author spends most of these pages recounting tales and relating them to other historical events. The document is presented in the form of a debate by the 318 "orthodox fathers" of the First Council of Nicaea.

=== Opening (chapters 1–20) ===
These fathers pose the question, "Of what doth the Glory of Kings consist?" One Gregory answers with a speech (chapters 3–17) which ends with the statement that a copy of the Glory of God was made by Moses and kept in the Ark of the Covenant. After this, the archbishop Dĕmâtĕyôs (Note: Identified in ch. 14 as "Archbishop of Rôm" (i.e. Constantinople), and in ch. 94 as of Antioch. This person might be identified with Patriarch Domnus II of Antioch, who was deposed at the Second Council of Ephesus. E. A. Wallis Budge transliterates his name as "Domitius" in his first edition (Budge 1922, p. 14) and "Timotheus" in his second edition (Budge 1932, ch. 14).) reads from a book he had found in the church of "Sophia", which introduces what Hubbard calls "the centerpiece" of this work, the story of Makeda (better known as the Queen of Sheba), King Solomon, Menelik I, and how the Ark came to Ethiopia (chapters 19–94). Although the author of the final redaction identified this Gregory with Gregory Thaumaturgus, who lived in the 3rd century before this Council, the time and the allusion to Gregory's imprisonment for 15 years by the king of Armenia make Gregory the Illuminator a better fit. (Note: Hubbard notes that it is "a tendency common in Near Eastern writings to merge people of the same name". (Hubbard 1956, p. 253))

=== The Queen of Sheba and Menelik (chapters 21–95) ===
Queen Makeda learns from Tamrin, a merchant based in her kingdom, about the wisdom of King Solomon, and travels to Jerusalem to visit him. She is enthralled by his display of learning and knowledge, and declares "From this moment I will not worship the sun, but will worship the Creator of the sun, the God of Israel" (chapter 28). The night before she begins her journey home, Solomon tricks her into sleeping with him, giving her a ring so their child may identify himself to Solomon. Following her departure, Solomon has a dream in which the sun leaves Israel (chapter 30).

On the journey home, she gives birth to Menelik in Bala Zädisareya (chapter 32).

At 22, Menelik travels to Jerusalem through Gaza, seeking Solomon's blessing, and identifies himself to his father with the ring. Overjoyed by this reunion, Solomon tries to convince Menelik to stay and succeed him as king, but Menelik insists on returning to his mother in Ethiopia. King Solomon then settled for sending home with him a company formed from the first-born sons of the elders of his kingdom. This company of young men, upset over leaving Jerusalem, smuggled the Ark of the Covenant from Solomon's Temple and out of the kingdom (chapters 45–48) without Menelik's knowledge. He had asked Solomon only for a single tassel from the tekhelet-coloured travel cloth covering the Ark, and Solomon had given him the entire thing.

During the journey home, Menelik learns the Ark is with him, and Solomon discovers it is gone from his kingdom. The king attempts to pursue Menelik, but through the Ark's mysterious power, his son, with his entire entourage, is miraculously flown home to Ethiopia before Solomon can leave his kingdom. King Solomon then turns to solace from his wife, the daughter of the Pharaoh, and she seduces him into worshiping the idols of her land (chapter 64).

==== Stories of Kings ====
After a question from the 318 bishops of the Council, Domitius continues with a paraphrase of Biblical history (chapters 66–83). Specifically, he focuses on the central element of lineage and royal bloodlines that were prevalent then. He discusses the intermixing of the royal families to preserve their power and ensure their bloodline survives. He does this by using each chapter to describe a specific family line, such as discussing the family tree of Constantine (chapters 72-73) or to describe two separate seeds of Shem (chapters 74-75). In chapter 90, we see a heavy emphasis on God's law and the rules he sets forth for his believers to follow, which he presents by choosing the house of Jacob to reign as kings and spread God's message. The author then describes Menelik's arrival at Axum, where he is feasted, and Makeda abdicates the throne in his favour. Menelik then engages in a series of military campaigns with the Ark, and "no man conquered him, on the contrary, whosoever attacked him was conquered" (chapter 94). After chapter 94, the author takes a step back and describes a more global view of what he had been describing in previous chapters.

=== Prophecies (chapters 96–117) ===
After praising the king of Ethiopia, the king of Egypt, and the book Domitius was found, which has established not only Ethiopia's possession of the true Ark of the Covenant, but that the Solomonic dynasty is descended from the first-born son of Solomon (chapter 95). Gregory then delivers an extended speech with prophetic elements (chapters 95–112), forming what Hubbard calls a "Patristic collection of Prophecies". The Kebra Nagast has a marked anti-Jewish attitude, describing the Jews as "wicked" and "iniquitous", arguing that they had become unworthy custodians of the Ark of the Covenant. Hubbard notes "[t]here can be little doubt that chapters 102–115 are written as polemic against, if not an evangel to, the Jews. These chapters seek to prove by Old Testament allegories and proof-texts the Messianic purpose of Jesus, the validity of the Ethiopian forms of worship, and the spiritual supremacy of Ethiopia over Israel". Hubbard further speculates that this selection from the Old Testament might be as old as Frumentius, who had converted the Kingdom of Axum to Christianity.

The Kebra Nagast concludes with a final prophecy that the power of Rome will be eclipsed by the power of Ethiopia, and describes how king Kaleb of Axum will subdue the Jews living in Najran, and make his younger son Gabra Masqal his heir (chapter 117).

== History ==
=== Origins ===
According to the colophon attached to most of the existing copies, the Kebra Nagast originally was written in Coptic, then translated into Arabic in the "year of mercy" 409 (dated to AD 1225), and then into Ge'ez by a team of clerics in Ethiopia—Yəsḥaq, Yəmḥarännä ˀAb, Ḥəzbä-Krəstos, Ǝndrəyas, Filəp̣p̣os, and Mäḥari ˀAb—during the office of Abuna Abba Giyorgis and possibly at the command of the governor of Enderta Ya'ibika Igzi'. Based on the testimony of this colophon, "Conti Rossini, Littmann, and Cerulli, inter alios, have marked off the period 1314 to 1321–1322 for the composition of the book". During the time of the Zagwe dynasty, the chief of Enderta played a major role in supporting the Solomonids along with the chief priest of Aksum by the name of Tekeste Birhane; the two are listed among the most influential dignitires on the side of Yekuno Amlak. Other sources put it as a work of the fourteenth century Nebura’ed Yeshaq of Aksum.

The central Solomonic narrative of the text is thought to derive from the Zagwe dynasty, who believed the Axumites were descended from Solomon. Because of this, the Solomonic myth might be rooted in half remembered oral traditions of an ancient Eurasian back migration into Ethiopia. Alternatively, this may have been due to a sort of Axumite philosemitism, with Ezana calling himself a follower of the "god of Israel" and the later king Israel of Axum. "Makeda" might have its origins in multiple terms. Sabaean inscriptions mention mlkt (𐩣𐩡𐩫𐩩, "queen"); furthermore, Sabaean tribes knew the title of mqtwyt (𐩣𐩤𐩩𐩥𐩺𐩩, "high official"). Alternatively Makueda, the personal name of the queen in Ethiopian legend might be interpreted as a popular rendering of the title of mqtwyt. The tradition that the biblical Queen of Sheba was an ingenuous ruler of Ethiopia who visited King Solomon in Jerusalem is repeated in a 1st-century account by the Roman Jewish historian Josephus. He identified Solomon's visitor as a queen of Egypt and Ethiopia. Other historians consider parts of the Kebre Negast date to as late as the end of the sixteenth century, when Muslim incursions and contacts with the wider Christian world made the Ethiopian Church concerned with asserting its character and Jewish traditions.

Some historians have been suspicious of the statement on the colophon and have suggested that the authors of the original text itself were Ethiopian scribes. Historian Stuart Munro-Hay stated that there is no record of Ethiopian monarchs claiming descent from Solomon before the 13th century.

Careful study of the text has revealed traces of Arabic, possibly pointing to an Arabic Vorlage (prior version), but no clear evidence of a previous Coptic version. Many scholars doubt that a Coptic version ever existed, and that the history of the text goes back no further than the Arabic vorlage. (Note: Hubbard 1956, for example, claims to have found only one word which points to a Coptic version, p. 370.) The numerous quotations in the text from the Bible were not translated from this hypothetical Arabic vorlage, but were copied from the Ethiopian translation of the Bible, either directly or from memory, and in their use and interpretation shows the influence of patristic sources such as Gregory of Nyssa. (Note: One example is that in chapters 106–107 all but three passages quoted also appear in Gregory of Nyssa's Testimonia adversus Judeos. (Hubbard 1956, p. 39))

Old Testament scholar David Allan Hubbard has alleged Patristic, Qur'anic, Rabbinical and Apocryphal texts as sources for the Kebra Nagast. The Kebra Nagast itself claims that the original text was found by the Archbishop of Rome (i.e. Constantinople) in the Church of Saint Sophia and that he read the manuscript claimed the world belonged to the Emperor of Rome and the Emperor of Ethiopia. Hubbard details the many sources that the compiler of the Kebra Nagast drew on in creating this work. They include not only both Testaments of the Bible (although heavier use is made of the Old Testament than the New), but he detects evidence of Rabbinical sources, and influence from deuterocanonical or apocryphal works (especially the Book of Enoch and Book of Jubilees, both canonical in the Ethiopian Orthodox Church, and such Syriac works as the Book of the Cave of Treasures, and its derivatives the Book of Adam and Eve and the Book of the Bee). (Note: This is the stated aim of Hubbard's doctoral thesis, "The Literary Sources".) Marcus thus describes it as "a pastiche of legends ... [that] blended local and regional oral traditions and style and substance derived from the Old and New Testaments, various apocryphal texts, Jewish and Islamic commentaries, and Patristic writings".

=== Early European translations ===
One of the earliest collections of documents of Ethiopia came through the writings of Francisco Álvares, official envoy which king Manuel I of Portugal, sent to Dawit II of Ethiopia, under Ambassador Dom Rodrigo de Lima. In the papers concerning this mission, Álvares included an account of the Emperor of Ethiopia, and a description in Portuguese of the habits of the Ethiopians, titled The Prester John of the Indies, which was printed in 1533.

The Jesuit missionary Pedro Páez included a detailed translation of the Kebra Nagast through Menelek's return to Aksum with the Ark of the Covenant in his História da Ethiópia. Completed in the early 1620s, the manuscript was not published in Páez's lifetime. However, it provided the foundation for many of the Jesuit accounts of Ethiopia that came after his, including those of Manuel de Almeida and Balthazar Telles.

Additional information on the Kebra Nagast was included by the Jesuit priest Manuel de Almeida in his Historia de Etiopía. Almeida was sent out as a missionary to Ethiopia, and had abundant opportunity to learn about the Kebra Nagast at first hand, owing to his excellent command of the language. His manuscript is a valuable work. His brother, Apollinare, also went out to the country as a missionary and was, along with his two companions, stoned to death in Tigray.

In the first quarter of the 16th century, P.N. Godinho published some traditions about King Solomon and his son Menelik, derived from the Kebra Nagast. Further information about the contents of the Kebra Nagast was supplied by Baltazar Téllez (1595–1675), the author of the Historia General de Etiopía Alta (Coimbra, 1660). The sources of Téllez's work were the histories of Manuel de Almeida, Afonso Mendes and Jerónimo Lobo.

=== Modern scholarship ===
It was not until the close of the eighteenth century, when James Bruce of Kinnaird, the famous Scottish travel writer, published an account of his travels in search of the sources of the Nile, that information as to the contents of the Kebra Nagast came to be generally known among European scholars and theologians.

When Bruce was leaving Gondar, Ras Mikael Sehul, the powerful Inderase (regent) of Emperor Tekle Haymanot II, gave him several of the most valuable Ethiopic manuscripts. Among them was a copy of the Kebra Nagast. When the third edition of Bruce's Travels to Discover the Source of the Nile was published in 1813, a description of the contents of the original manuscript was included. In due course these documents were given to the Bodleian Library (shelfmark Bruce 87).

August Dillmann prepared a summary of the contents of the Kebra Nagast, and published its colophon, but no substantial portion of the narrative in the original language was available until F. Praetorius published Chapters 19 through 32 with a Latin translation. Another 35 years passed before the entire text was published, by Carl Bezold, with commentary, in 1905. The first English translation was prepared by E. A. Wallis Budge, and was published in two editions in 1922 and 1932. (Note: This overview is based on Hubbard 1956, pp. 6–8.)

Modern scholarly consensus is that there is no historical evidence supporting the legends relating to the claimed origins of the Solomonic dynasty in the Kebra Negast. There is no credible basis to the claims that the Aksumite royal house was descended from Solomon (or that any Aksumite king even claimed such an ancestry) or that Yekuno Amlak, the 13th century founder of the dynasty, was descended from the Aksumite royal house. Solomon is dated to the 10th century BCE, hundreds of years before the founding of Aksum. Historian Harold G. Marcus describes the stories of the Kebra Nagast as a "pastiche of legends" created to legitimize Yekuno Amlak's seizure of power. David Northrup notes that

the Kebra Nagast's imaginative and emotive account of a line of descent from Solomon and Sheba to the kings of Aksum and the new Solomonic dynasty is highly improbable and unsupported by evidence. It is a myth.

The Ethiopian regnal list from 1922 takes much from the national epic, and claims that an "Ag'azyan" dynasty had reigned from 1985 to 982 BC. The dynasty was allegedly founded by a man named Akbunas Saba (Sheba), "of the posterity of the kingdom of Joctan," a descendant of Shem (ሴም, Sēm), and the last ruler of this line was Makeda (the queen of Sheba). This regnal list, however, is not considered historically accurate and has been treated by historians as little more than a vague notion of historical tradition in Northeast Africa. Historian Manfred Kropp states the spelling is likely a transcribal error and meant to say as the Ethiopian syllable signs da and 'a are relatively easy to confuse with each other. They are said to have pushed the tribe of Kam (Ham), also referred to as "Kasu" (Ethiopian term for Kushites also used in both the Ezana Stone and Kebra Nagast) out of the region and forming their own dynasty, being the ancestors of the Queen of Sheba and ultimately the Solomonic Dynasty. This likely describes the arrival of the Ethio-Semites in the horn of Africa and origin of Dʿmt. According to both Alaqa Taye Gabra Mariam's History of the People of Ethiopia and Heruy Wolde Selassie in his book Wazema, this originated from the liberation of Ethiopia from the rule of the Kamites and three of Joktan's sons divided Ethiopia between themselves. Sheba received Tigre, Obal (Hebrew: עובָל) received Adal and Ophir received Ogaden. So according to this, the later monarchs who followed Sheba ruled from the region around Axum. Agazi, the progenitor of the eponymous dynasty, is instead said to have slain the serpent Arwe, which is credited to Menelik I in the Kebra. The term Madrā Ag'azi also appears in the Gädlä Marqorewos (Conti Rossini 1904, 27 (text); 38, tr.) as the realm of King Mənəlik I.

== See also ==
- Fetha Nagast
