= Church of Our Lady Mary of Zion =

Ethiopian Orthodox Tewahedo Church in Tigray Region

Coordinates: 14°07′49″N 38°43′10″E

Church of Our Lady St. Mary of Zion
- ርዕሰ አድባራት ቅድስተ ቅዱሳን ድንግል ማሪያም ጽዮን
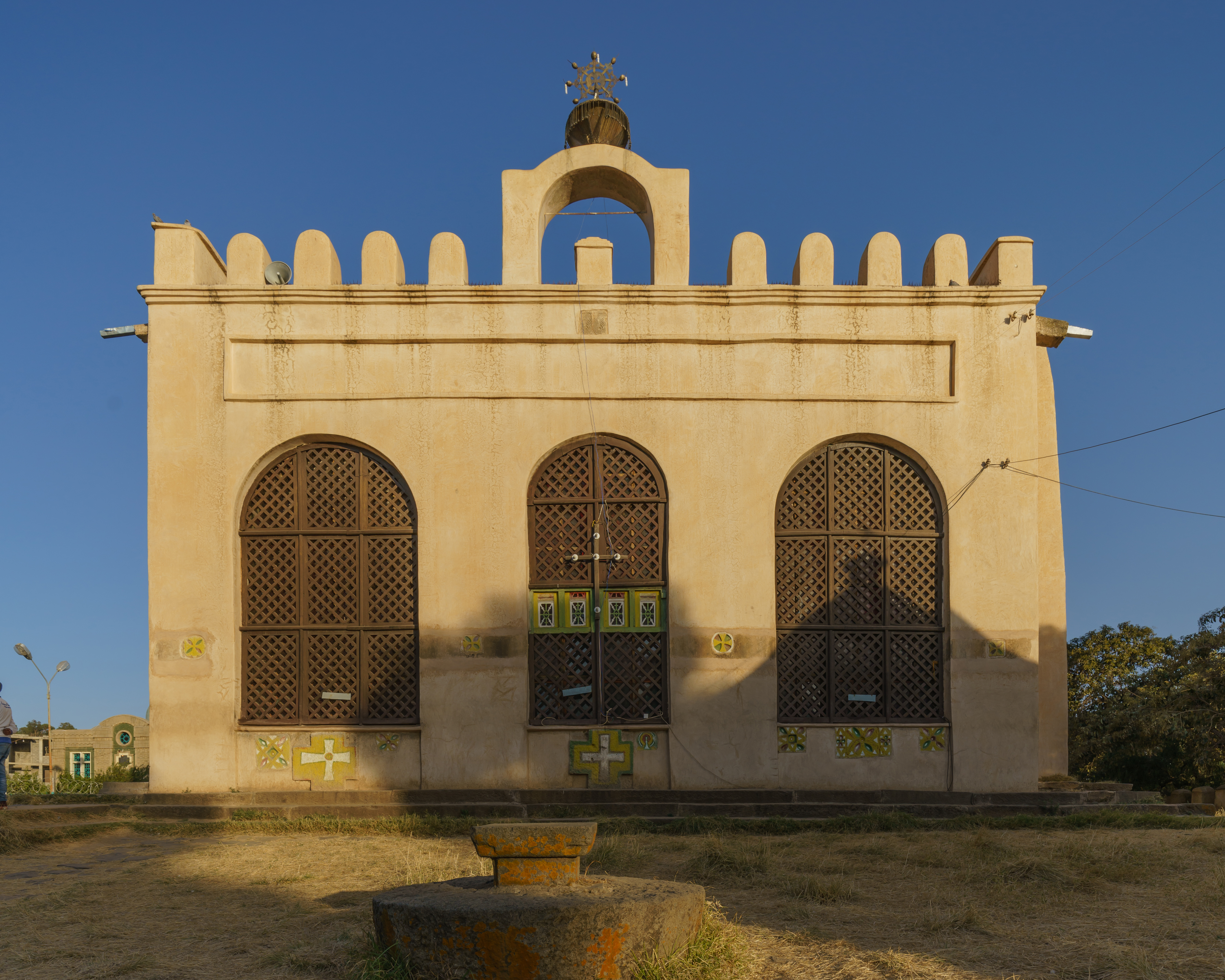
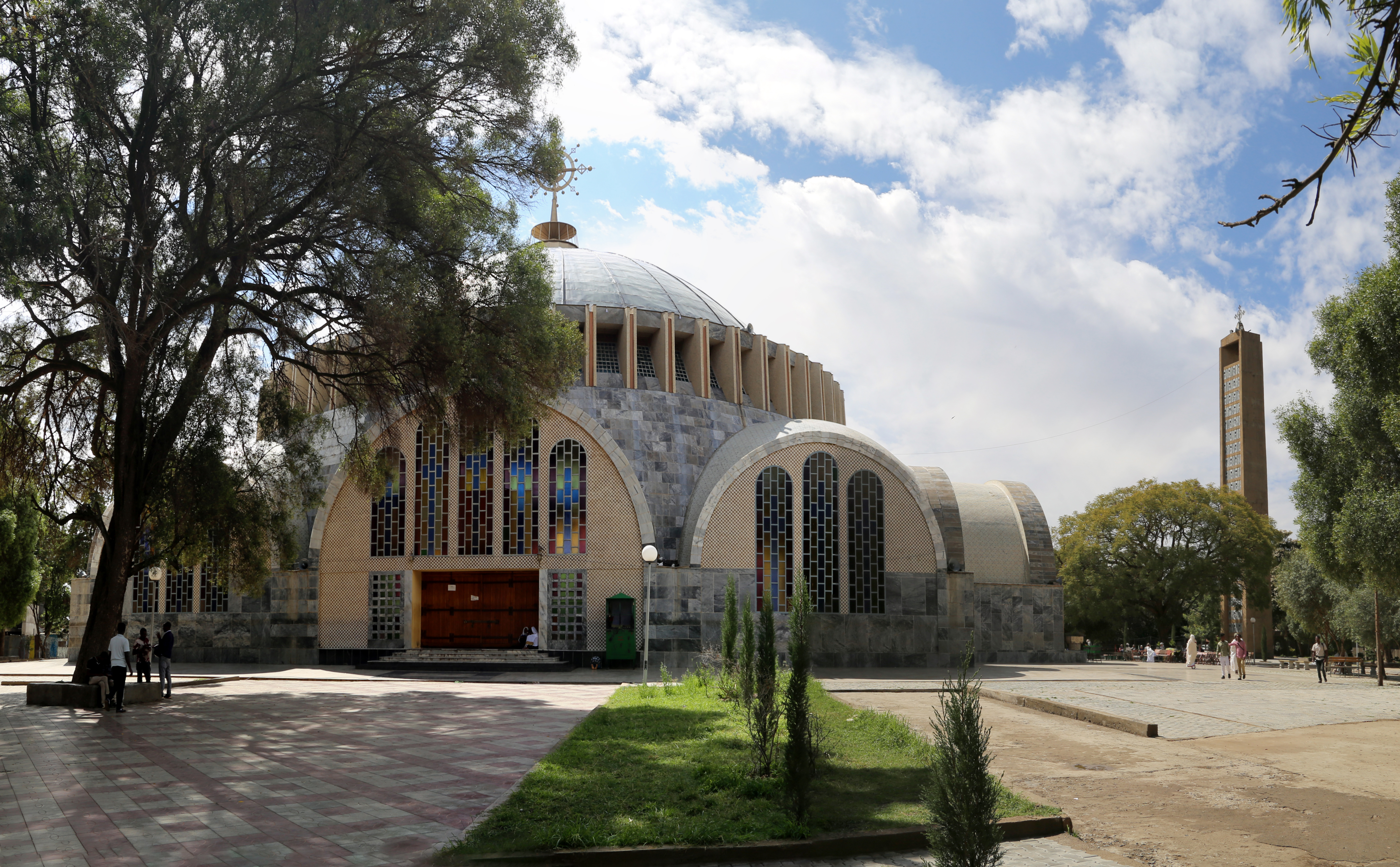
- Old church (top) and modern basilica (bottom) of St. Mary of Zion
- Church of Our Lady St. Mary of Zion
- Location: Axum, Tigray Region
- Country: Ethiopia
- Denomination: Oriental Orthodox
- Tradition: Ethiopian Orthodox Tewahedo Church

History
- Status: Church complex (Old and New)
- Founded: Original: 4th century Old: 17th century Modern: 1950s–1964
- Founder(s): Original: Ezana of Axum (4th c.); Old: Fasilides (17th c.); New: Haile Selassie (1950s–1964)
- Dedication: Saint Mary

Architecture
- Functional status: Active
- Style: Old: Gondarine-style (17th c.); New: Modern basilica/dome (mid-20th c.)

Specifications
- Materials: Stone, mortar (Old); reinforced concrete & stone (New)

Administration
- Diocese: Diocese of Axum

The Church of Our Lady, Mary of Zion (Note: Ge'ez: ርዕሰ አድባራት ቅድስተ ቅዱሳን ድንግል ማሪያም ጽዮን, romanized: Re-ese Adbarat Kidiste Kidusan Dingel Maryam Ts'iyon; Tigrinya: ቤተ-ክርስትያን እመቤትና ማርያም ጽዮን, romanized: Bet-Kristiyan 'Embetena Mariyam Ts’iyon; Amharic: የእመቤታችን ማርያም ጽዮን ቤተ ክርስቲያን, romanized: Ye’Imebētachin Mariyam Ts’iyon Bēte Kirisitīyan) is regarded as the holiest Ethiopian Orthodox Tewahedo Church which is claimed to contain the Ark of the Covenant.

The church is located in the town of Axum, Tigray Region in northern Ethiopia, near the grounds of Obelisks of Axum. The original church is believed to have been built during the reign of Ezana the first Christian ruler of the Kingdom of Axum (present-day Eritrea and Ethiopia), during the 4th century AD, and has been rebuilt several times since then. Women are not permitted entry into the “Old Church”; the Blessed Virgin Mary, representing the archetype of the Ark, is the only place women are allowed within its premises.

== History ==
Since its founding during the episcopacy of Frumentius, the first Bishop of Axum, (known in Ethiopia as Abune Selama Kesatie Birhan or "Our Father of Peace the Revealer of Light"), the Church of Mary of Zion has been destroyed and rebuilt at least once, or twice as according to tradition. Its first putative destruction occurred at the hands of Queen Gudit during the 10th century, although this isn't ascertained by historiography. Its second, and first confirmed, destruction occurred in the 16th century at the hands of Ahmad ibn Ibrahim al-Ghazi, after which it was rebuilt by the Emperor Gelawdewos, then further rebuilt and enlarged by Fasilides during the 17th century. Francisco Álvares, who was in Ethiopia before its destruction, describes it as follows:

...a very noble church, the first there was in Ethiopia: it is named Mary of Syon. They say that it is so named because its altar stone came from Sion. In this country (as they say) they have the custom always to name the churches by the altar stone, because on it is written the name of the patron saint. This stone which they have in this church, they say that the apostles sent it from Mount Sion. This church is very large; it has five aisles of good width and of great length, vaulted above, and all the vaults closed, the ceiling and sides all painted. Below, the body of the church is well worked with handsome cut stone; it has seven chapels, all with their backs to the east, and their altars well ornamented. It has a choir after our fashion, except that it is low, and they reach the vaulted roof with their heads; and the choir is also over the vault, and they do not use it. This church has a very large circuit, paved with flagstones like the lids of tombs. This consists of a very high wall, and it is not covered over like those of the other churches, but is left open. This church has a large enclosure, and it is also surrounded with another larger enclosure, like the enclosing wall of a large town or city. Within this enclosure are handsome groups of one storey buildings, and all spout out their water by strong figures of lions and dogs of stone [of different colours]. Inside this large enclosure there are two mansions, one on the right hand and the other on the left, which belong to the two rectors of the church; and the other houses are of canons and monks.

The church of Saint Mary of Zion was the traditional place where Ethiopian Emperors came to be crowned. Which indeed meant if an Emperor was not crowned at Axum, or did not at least have his coronation ratified by a special service at St. Mary of Zion, he could not be referred to by the title of "Atse".

The church is a significant center of pilgrimage for the Ethiopian Orthodox Tewahedo Church, especially during the “Festival of Zion Mariam” on 30 November (21 Hidar on the Ethiopian calendar).

=== Tigray War ===
In mid-December 2020 during the Tigray War, according to Europe External Programme with Africa (EEPA), 750 people who were hiding in the church were brought out and killed by militants. Locals suspected an intention to steal the Ark of the Covenant, but no evidence of that allegation has been found to date.

A more recent report by Amnesty International points to war crimes committed by Eritrean troops in and around Aksum, and de facto desacralisation of the church, but these reports have not been confirmed by independent investigation or by the Ethiopian Human Rights Commission.

The Ethiopian government has blocked forensic investigators from accessing the church grounds, and also blocked all external attempts at investigating human rights violations that occurred both at the church and in Axum. The International Commission of Human Rights Experts on Ethiopia (ICHREE) has called for the Ethiopian government to "provide unhindered access to the ICHREE and other independent investigative bodies, alongside independent media, to thoroughly examine these allegations of human rights violations", but as of August 2023 the government continues to block independent investigation.

== Ark of the Covenant ==
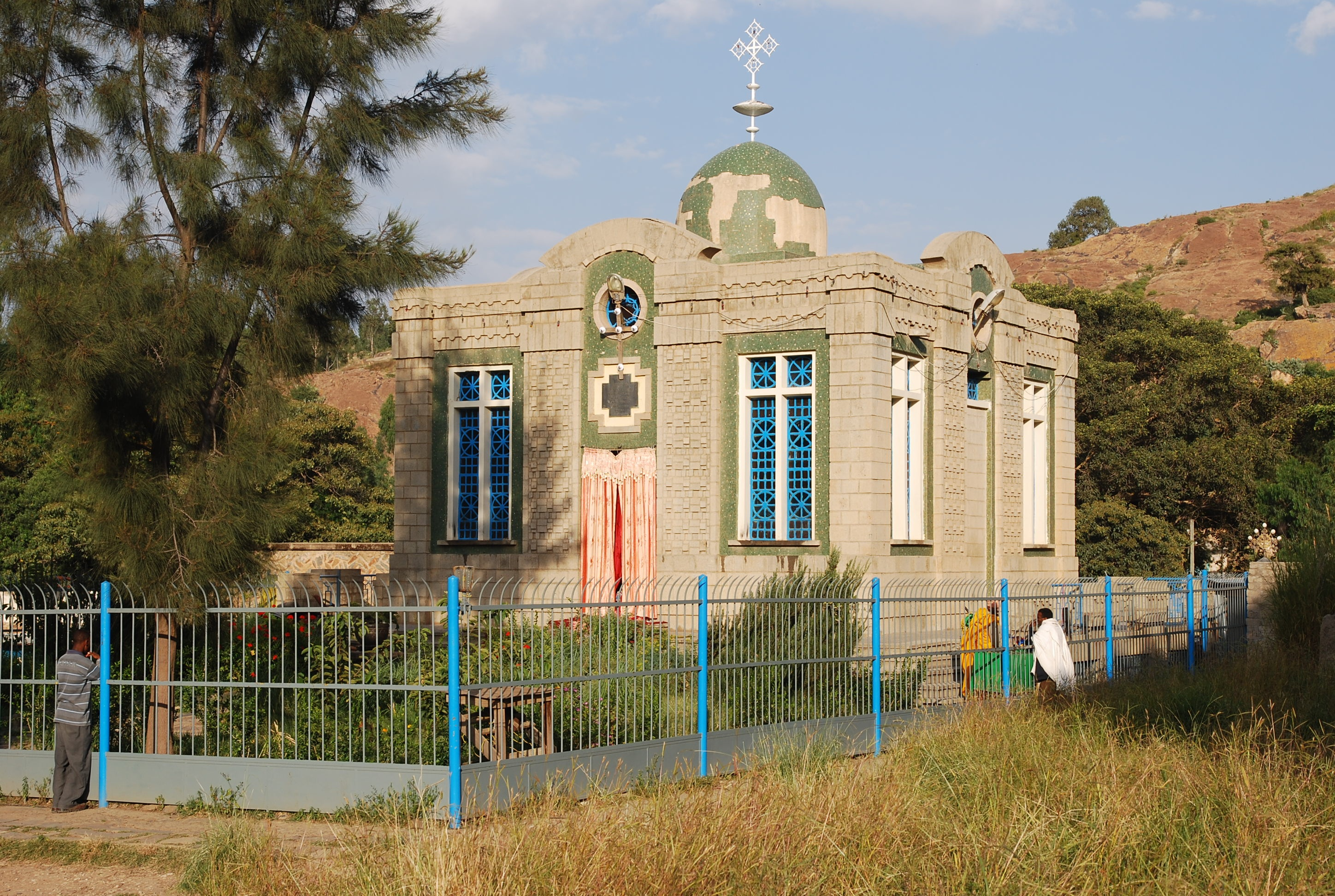
The Chapel of the Tablet.

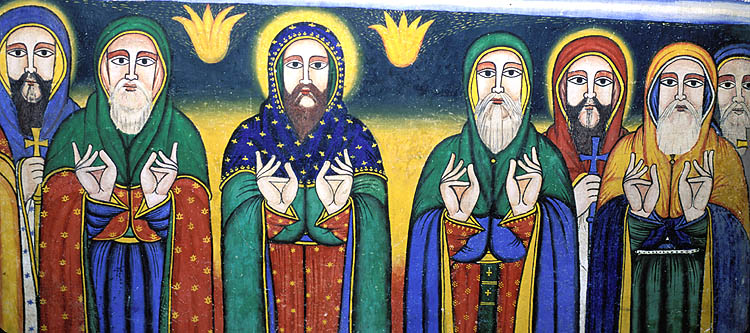
Painting of the Nine Saints (not all in photo) of the Ethiopian Church, as depicted on the mural in the Church of Our Lady Mary of Zion.

The Church of Saint Mary of Zion claims to contain the original Ark of the Covenant.

Accordingly, the Ark was moved to the Chapel of the Tablet adjacent to the old church because a divine 'heat' from the Tablets had cracked the stones of its previous inner sanctum. The Ethiopian Empress Menen funded the construction of the present chapel.

According to pious tradition, the Ark came to Ethiopia with Crown prince Menelik I after he visited his father King Solomon in Jerusalem.

On 9 June 1992, a former professor of Ethiopian Studies at the University of London, Edward Ullendorff, declared that he personally examined the ark contained within the church in 1941 while serving as an officer of the British Army. He described the ark as empty, and a “Middle- to late-medieval construction [from] when these were fabricated ad hoc."

At present, only the guardian monk may view the Ark, in accordance with the Biblical accounts of the dangers of doing so for non-Kohanim. This lack of accessibility, and questions about the account as a whole, have led Ethiopians and foreign scholars alike to express doubt about the veracity of the claim. The guardian monk is appointed for life by his predecessor before the predecessor dies. If the incumbent guardian dies without naming a successor, then the monks of the monastery hold an election to select the new guardian. The guardian then is confined to the chapel of the Ark of the Covenant for the rest of his life, praying before it and offering incense.

== Burials ==
- Tekle Giyorgis I, in the churchyard
