= Pharaoh's daughter (wife of Solomon) =

Biblical figure; wife of the Israelite king Solomon

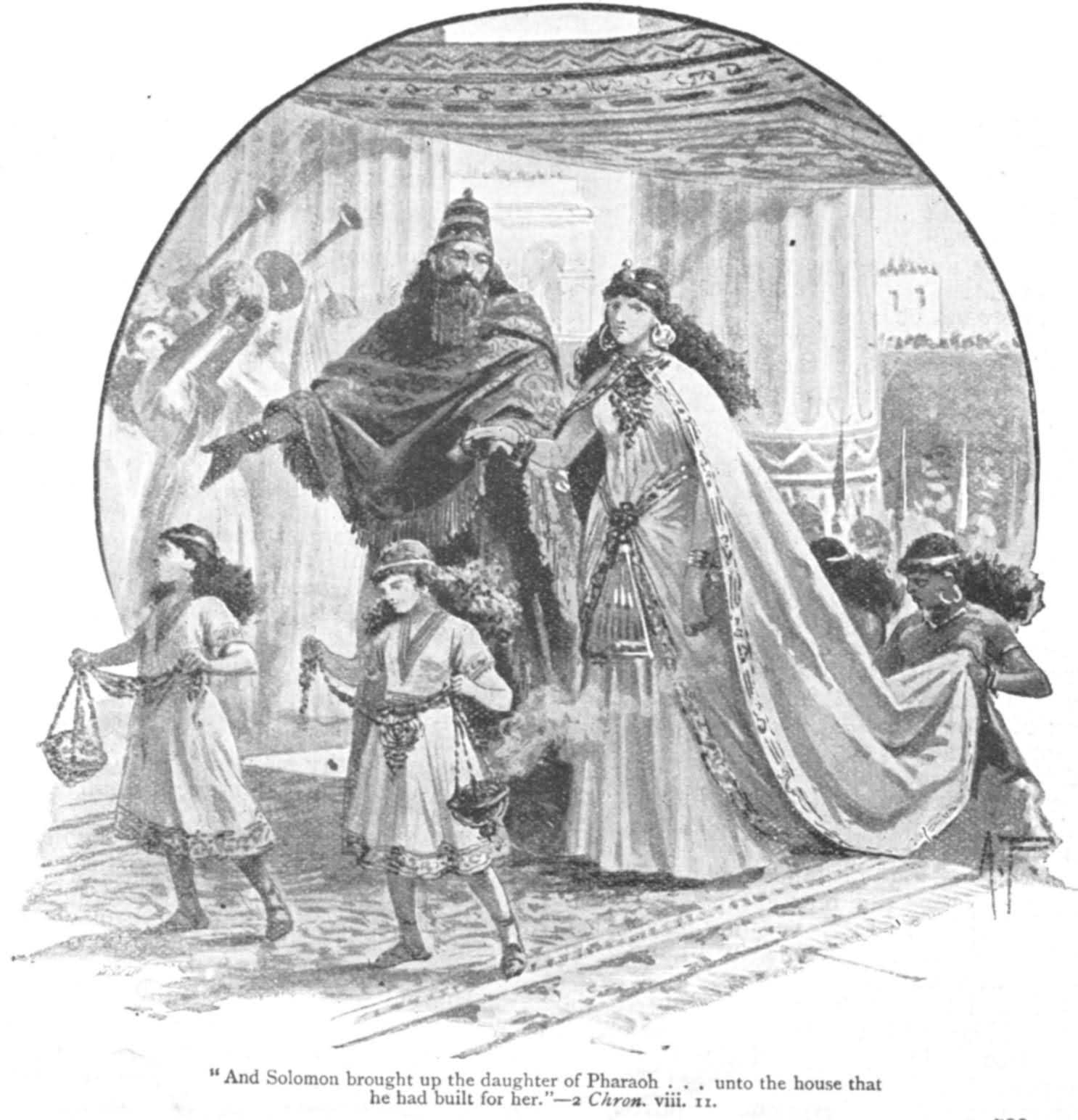
King Solomon and his wife Pharaoh's daughter

The Pharaoh's daughter is a figure in the Hebrew Bible who is described as marrying Solomon to cement a political alliance between the United Monarchy of Israel and Egypt.

== Biblical narrative ==
While there is no archaeological evidence of a marriage between an Egyptian princess, the daughter of a Pharaoh, and a king of united Israel, claims of one are made at several places in the Hebrew Bible. (Note: All scripture quotes are taken from the 1917 Jewish Publication Society Bible, now in the public domain.)

=== A marriage alliance ===
- 1 Kings 3:1 says,

"And Solomon became allied to Pharaoh king of Egypt by marriage, and took Pharaoh's daughter, and brought her into the city of David, until he had made an end of building his own house, and the house of the Lord, and the wall of Jerusalem round about."

The fact that Pharaoh's daughter has been singled out in the accounts of Solomon is significant as similar treatment is not given to his "seven hundred wives, princesses, and three hundred concubines" (1 Kings 11:3). Some scholars believe this unique example was because this marriage in particular "demonstrates the wealth and power of the Hebrew monarchy, for Pharaoh's daughters did not ordinarily marry outside of their own family, and perhaps indicates the weakness of the Egyptian kingdom at this time." Another scholar points out that marrying Pharaoh's daughter is significant in light of the story of Exodus, "A descendant of former Egyptian slaves now became Pharaoh's son-in-law". Most scholars believe the alliance was a result of the reputation of Solomon's father, "Under David, Israel had become a factor to be reckoned with in Eastern politics, and the Pharaoh found it prudent to secure its friendship." The alliance through marriage is seen by scholars as the reason for the reported increase in trade with Egypt at 1 Kings 10:28–29.

=== City of Gezer as dowry ===
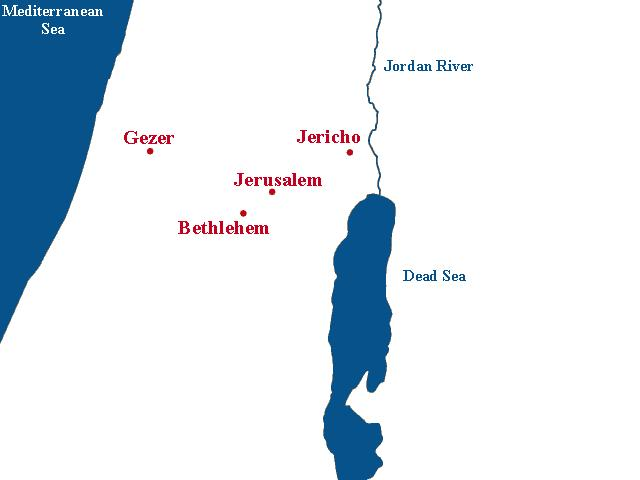
Location of the city of Gezer.

The narrative says that the Canaanite city of Gezer had never fallen before the Israelites from Joshua to David.

- Joshua 16:10 "And they drove not out the Canaanites that dwelt in Gezer; but the Canaanites dwelt in the midst of Ephraim, unto this day, and became servants to do taskwork."
- Judges 1:29 "And Ephraim drove not out the Canaanites that dwelt in Gezer; but the Canaanites dwelt in Gezer among them."
- 2 Samuel 5:25 "And David did so, as the Lord commanded him, and smote the Philistines from Geba until thou come to Gezer."

This situation changed when the Egyptian army invaded the city, ethnically cleansed the populace, and Pharaoh turned it over to his daughter as a wedding gift, whereby it became the property of Israel.

- 1 Kings 9:16

"Pharaoh king of Egypt had gone up, and taken Gezer, and burnt it with fire, and slain the Canaanites that dwelt in the city, and given it for a portion unto his daughter, Solomon's wife."

1 Kings 9:17 shows that Gezer "was now rebuilt and made a fortified city of Solomon."

The historian Josephus gives a similar account in his Antiquities of the Jews, Bk 8, Ch 6, Sec. 1:

"...he [Solomon] also built cities which might be counted among the strongest, Asor [Hazor] and Magedo [Megiddo], and the third Gazara [Gezer], which had indeed belonged to the Philistines; but Pharaoh, the king of Egypt, had made an expedition against it, and besieged it, and taken it by force; and when he had slain all its inhabitants, he utterly overthrew it, and gave it as a present to his daughter, who had been married to Solomon; for which reason the king rebuilt it, as a city that was naturally strong, and might be useful in wars, and the mutations of affairs that sometimes happen. Moreover, he built two other cities not far from it, Betchora [Beth-horon] was the name of one of them, and Beleth [Baalath] of the other. He also built other cities that lay conveniently for these, in order to the enjoyment of pleasures and delicacies in them, such as were naturally of a good temperature of the air, and agreeable for fruits ripe in their proper seasons, and well watered with springs."

=== Palace built ===
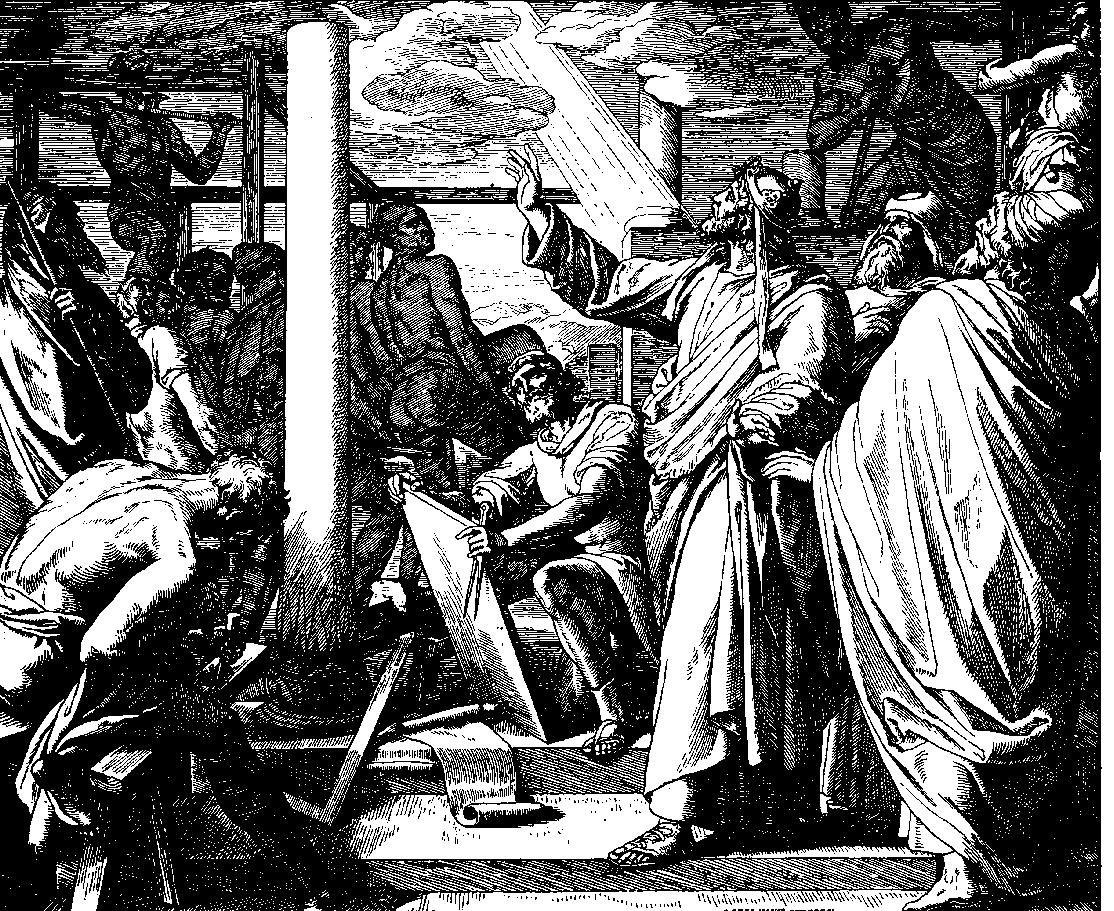
Depiction of Solomon directing his builders.

According to 1 Kings 9:20–23, Solomon enslaved, "All the people that were left of the Amorites, the Hittites, the Perizzites, the Hivites, and the Jebusites" and he had members of "the children of Israel ... rule over the people that wrought in the work." The slaves produced many structures for Solomon including a palace for Pharaoh's daughter.

- 1 Kings 7:8–12

"And [Solomon built] his [own] house where he might dwell, in the other court, within the porch, was of the like work. He made also a house for Pharaoh's daughter, whom Solomon had taken to wife, like unto this porch. All these were of costly stones, according to the measures of hewn stones, sawed with saws, within and without, even from the foundation unto the coping, and so on the outside unto the great court. And the foundation was of costly stones, even great stones, stones of ten cubits, and stones of eight cubits. And above were costly stones, after the measure of hewn stones, and cedar-wood. And the great court round about had three rows of hewn stone, and a row of cedar beams, like as the inner court of the house of the Lord, and the court of the porch of the house."

=== Removed from Jerusalem ===
1 Kings 3:1 states that Solomon brought Pharaoh's daughter "into the city of David, until he had completed building his own house, and the house of the Lord, and the wall of Jerusalem round about." Once the building was completed, she was moved out of the city, as were his other wives.

- 2 Chronicles 8:11

"And Solomon brought up the daughter of Pharaoh out of the city of David unto the house that he had built for her; for he said: 'No wife of mine shall dwell in the house of David king of Israel, because the places are holy, whereunto the ark of the Lord hath come.'"

- 1 Kings 9:24

"But Pharaoh's daughter came up out of the city of David unto her house which Solomon had built for her; then did he build Millo."

The Jewish scholar Rashi's commentary on the passage from 2 Chronicles shows that this relocation was not limited to Pharaoh's daughter. He states "Scripture explains: '…for he [Solomon] said, A woman shall not live with me in the city of David'".

Pharaoh's daughter was the only wife to be moved into her own palace.

=== Solomon's downfall ===
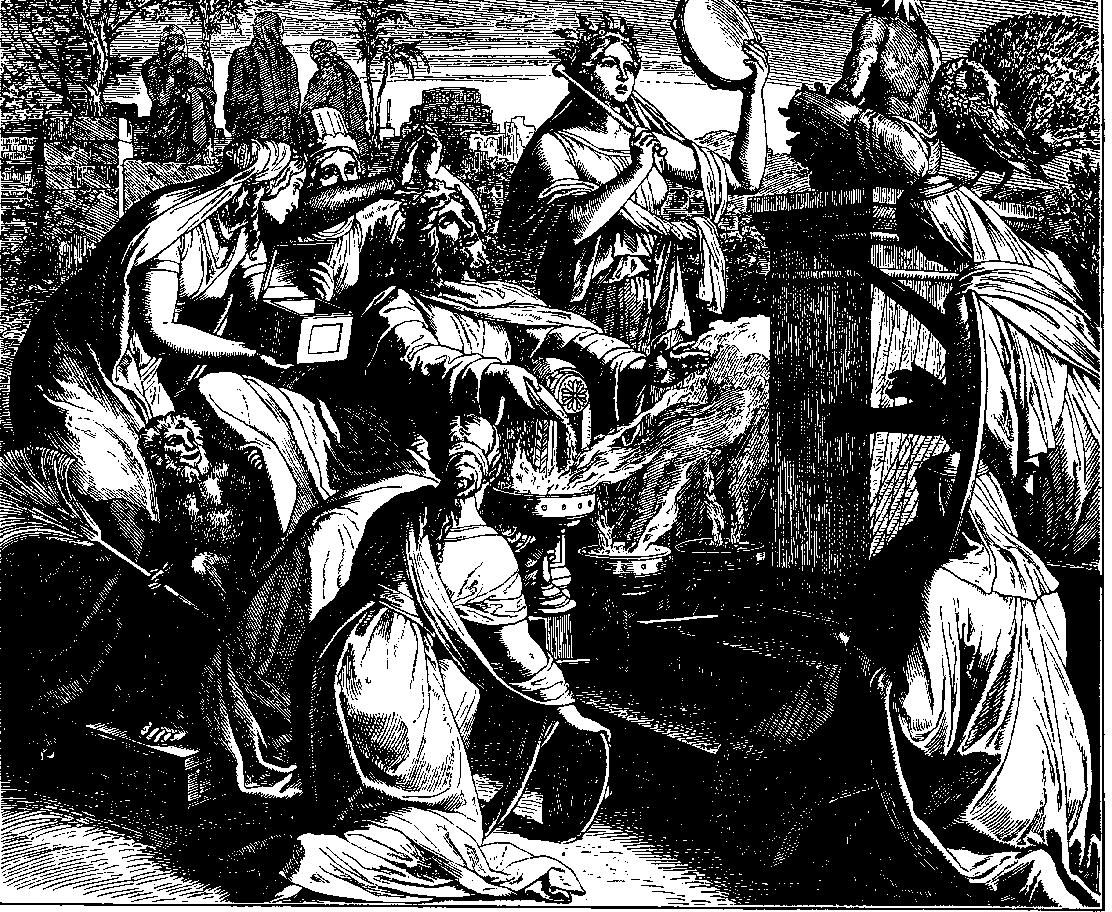
Depiction of Solomon worshiping with his queens.

The narrative in 1 Kings 11:1–10 describes Pharaoh's daughter and all of Solomon's wives as leading Solomon into the temptation of straying from the true worship of the God of Israel.

=== Divine punishment ===
1 Kings 11:11–13 says that Solomon's actions caused God to tell the King that the only thing keeping him from rending the kingdom from him to "give it to thy servant" was "for David thy father's sake". Instead Solomon's punishment would fall on "the hand of thy son" who was to be stripped of all but "one tribe". 1 Kings 11:14-22 says that God also "raised up an adversary unto Solomon, Hadad the Edomite … [who had] found great favour in the sight of Pharaoh". 1 Kings 11:23–25 says God "raised up another adversary unto him, Rezon the son of Eliada… And he was an adversary to Israel all the days of Solomon".

=== Song of Solomon ===
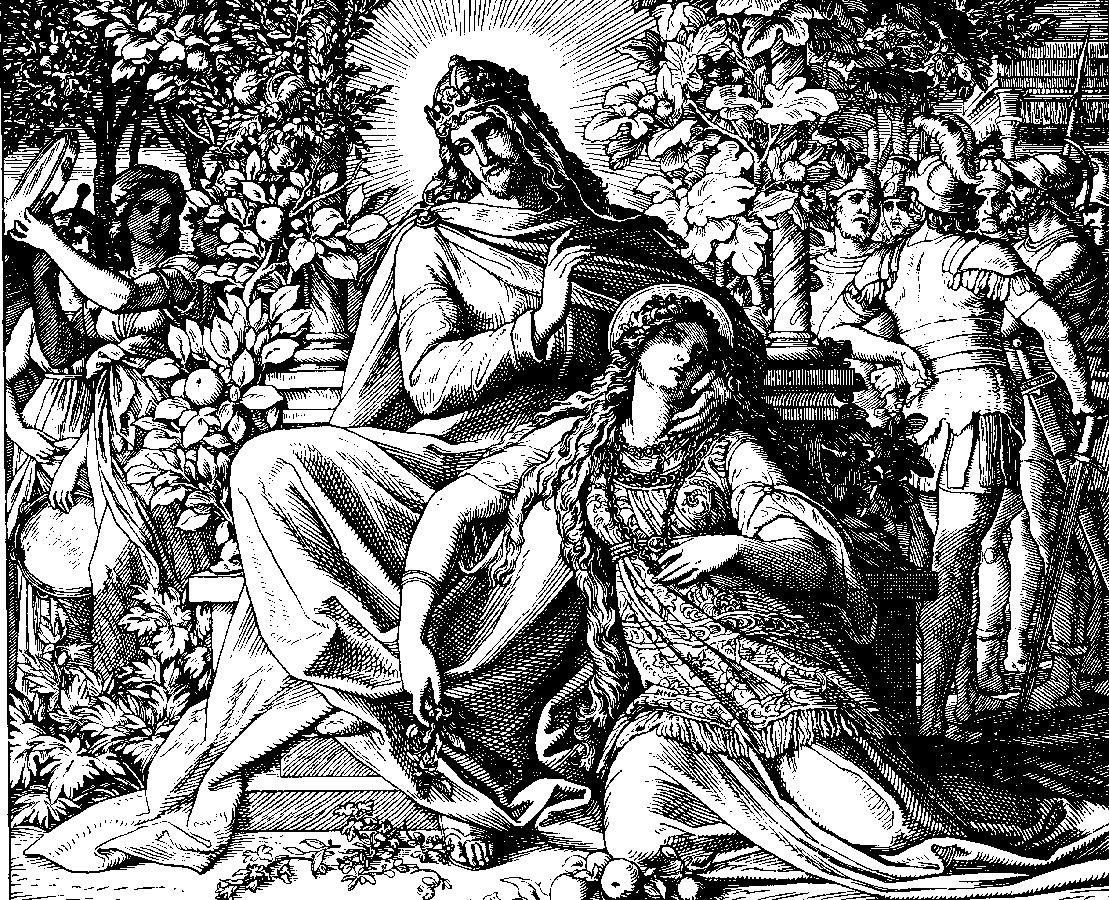
Depiction of Solomon and Pharaoh's daughter reciting the Song of Solomon.

There has been speculation going back to Origen that the woman addressed in the song is Pharaoh's daughter. John Wesley held that Psalm 45 (which he saw as "a kind of abridgement" of the Song of Solomon) also "alludes to the marriage between Solomon and Pharaoh's daughter." One of the points cited for this is the passage at Song 1:9 that states "I have compared thee, Oh my love, to a steed before Pharaoh's chariots." At Song 1:5 she is reported to say "I am black" and at Song 4:8-12 the woman is described as "my bride". Others hold that song is for the Queen of Sheba.

== Rabbinical sources ==
Many Jewish scholars, scribes, and rabbis have commentated on the relationship of Solomon and Pharaoh's daughter portrayed in the Hebrew scriptures.

=== Whether the marriage was forbidden ===
Avraham ben Yaakov reviewing the material points out that "Solomon's move was questionable" because it appeared to be outlawed by Deuteronomy 7:1-5, which said "neither shalt thou make marriages with them: thy daughter thou shalt not give unto his son, nor his daughter shalt thou take unto thy son. For he will turn away thy son from following Me, that they may serve other gods; so will the anger of the Lord be kindled against you, and He will destroy thee quickly."

This objection is held to be addressed by some, as the Talmud at Yevamos 76a says that Pharaoh's daughter converted to Judaism before she married Solomon. Yaakov goes on to outline Jewish thought on whether this caused the union to be ritually pure, "Some rabbis held that intermarriage would only be forbidden if the non-Israelite party to the marriage does not convert, but others held that converting them in order to marry is also forbidden." Some Tannaim look at the story of Solomon marrying Pharaoh's daughter and declare it a "criminal act."

There is also a discussion on Judaism's policy (which is found in the Talmud at Yevamos 24b) of forbidding conversion unless the "Jewish people is downtrodden." R' Shlomo Ganzfried outlines the policy saying that "during the reigns of King David and King Solomon, when the Jews enjoyed political autonomy and financial prosperity, no converts were accepted, since they were likely to be motivated by a desire for personal security and monetary gain. Likewise, proselytes will not be accepted in the Messianic era." This is held not to be the case with Pharaoh's daughter, as "the Talmud explicitly states that this did not apply to the daughter of Pharaoh, who had enough wealth not to need to marry Solomon for money (Talmud Yevamos 76a)."

A less settled question is whether Solomon could have converted and then married an Egyptian woman when Deuteronomy 23:8-9 states "thou shalt not abhor an Egyptian, because thou wast a stranger in his land. The children of the third generation that are born unto them may enter into the assembly of the Lord." Yaakov says that "this objection is countered by a tradition (not accepted halachically) that the referenced verse applies only to an Egyptian male but not to a female (which would make the law of the Egyptian parallel to the law forbidding a Moabite but not a Moabitess [such as Ruth] from ever entering the Assembly)".

==== Solomon's motivation ====
Jewish scribes say that Solomon's teacher was Shimei ben Gera, and while he lived, he prevented Solomon from marrying foreign wives. The Talmud says at Ber. 8a: "For as long as Shimei the son of Gera was alive Solomon did not marry the daughter of Pharaoh" (see also Midrash Tehillim to Ps. 3:1).

The Talmud at Sanhedrin 21b says Solomon knew that there were regulations in the Torah against some of his actions but at the time he felt he was wise enough to disregard them and not fall into sin "it is written: He shall not multiply wives to himself, whereon Solomon said, ‘I will multiply wives yet not let my heart be perverted.’ Yet we read, When Solomon was old, his wives turned away his heart. Again it is written: He shall not multiply to himself horses; concerning which Solomon said, ‘I will multiply them, but will not cause [Israel] to return [to Egypt].’ Yet we read: And a chariot came up and went out of Egypt for six [hundred shekels of silver]."

Avraham ben Yaakov tries to understand Solomon's motivations in the scripture texts saying "Since PHARAOH represents the OREPH ("back of the neck", same Hebrew letters as Pharaoh) of creation as opposed to its inner face, the conversion of his daughter by Solomon and her integration into the holy edifice that he was building was a 'coup' similar to the conversion of Batya, the daughter of Pharaoh who drew Moses out of the water. The 'daughter of Pharaoh' represents the source of all the different kinds of worldly wisdom (which are her 'handmaidens'). By 'converting' and 'marrying' her, Solomon was perhaps very daringly and ambitiously striving to deepen and enhance the revelation of God's unity on all levels of creation. If so, it was apparently still over-ambitious, because Solomon proved unable to hold his 'catch' within the bounds of holiness, and indeed he himself strayed beyond them." Yaakov also points out "Despite the many questions that surround it, we do not find Solomon's marriage to Pharaoh's daughter criticized in our text as being intrinsically sinful: verse 3 [1 Kings 3:3] does implicitly criticize Solomon for sacrificing at many high altars but does not criticize him for marrying Pharaoh's daughter. It was only in his old age, when Solomon took many wives, that he was criticized for allowing them to turn his heart aside from God."

=== Timing of the marriage ===
The Tannaim hold that the marriage "took place on the night when the Temple was completed." This is in conflict "with Seder Olam Rabbah 15, where it is held that Solomon married Pharaoh's daughter when he began to build the temple, that is, in the fourth year of his reign (comp. I Kings 6:1)." The Jewish Encyclopedia states "The particular love which he manifested for her (comp. 1 Kings 9:1) was rather a depraved passion; and she, more than all his other foreign wives, caused him to sin. He had drunk no wine during the seven years of the construction of the Temple; but on the night of its completion he celebrated his wedding with so much revelry that its sound mingled before God with that of the Israelites who celebrated the completion of the sacred edifice, and God at that time thought of destroying with the Temple the whole city of Jerusalem."

=== More stories of Pharaoh's daughter ===
The Jewish Encyclopedia lists a collection of other stories about Solomon and Pharaoh's daughter, saying she "brought Solomon 1,000 different kinds of musical instruments, explaining to him that each of them was used in the worship of a special idol. She hung over his bed a canopy embroidered with gems which shone like stars; so that every time he intended to rise, he, on looking at the gems, thought it was still night. He continued to sleep, with the keys of the Temple under his pillow; and the priests therefore were unable to offer the morning sacrifice. They informed his mother, Bath-sheba, who roused the king when four hours of the day had flown. She then reprimanded him for his conduct; and the verses of Proverbs 31:1–9 are considered by the Rabbis as having been pronounced by Bathsheba on that occasion."

=== Depth of Solomon's fall ===
In the Talmud at Shab. 56b the rabbinical defenders of Solomon say that the sin ascribed to him in 1 Kings 11 "is only figurative: it is not meant that Solomon fell into idolatry, but that he was guilty of failing to restrain his wives from idolatrous practices." The Jewish Encyclopedia points out that the opinion "prevalent in rabbinical literature is that Solomon lost his royalty, riches, and even his reason on account of his sins. This legend is based on the words 'I, Kohelet, was king over Israel in Jerusalem' (Eccl. i. 12, Hebr.), which show that when he uttered them he was no longer king. He gradually fell from the highest glory into the deepest misery. At first, Solomon reigned over the inhabitants of the upper world as well as over those of the lower; then only over the inhabitants of the earth; later over Israel only; then he retained only his bed and his stick; and finally his stick alone was left to him (Sanh. 20b)." Rabbi Pinchas Frankel places the blame of this fall on Solomon's wife Pharaoh's daughter. He bemoans her arrival to Solomon's court for "Unlike Pharaoh's daughter in the Story of the Exodus, who raised and developed [Moses] the Leader of the People of Israel, this daughter of Pharaoh will have the opposite effect upon this Leader of Israel, causing his level of spirituality to fall to the point where he will have to temporarily abandon the kingship."

=== Role in rise of Jeroboam ===
The Talmud states that Pharaoh's daughter played a role in why Jeroboam was found worthy of becoming ruler of the Northern Kingdom of Israel. At Sanhedrin 101b it says "Why did Jeroboam merit sovereignty? Because he reproved Solomon. And why was he punished? Because he reproved him publicly. As it is written, And this was the cause that he lifted up his hand against the king: Solomon built Millo, and repaired the breaches of the city of David his father. He said thus to him: Thy father David made breaches in the wall, that Israel might come up [to Jerusalem] on the Festivals; whilst thou hast closed them, in order to exact toll for the benefit of Pharaoh's daughter. What is meant by And this was the cause that he lifted up his hand against the king? — R. Nahman said: He took off his phylacteries in front of him."

Rashi explains that Solomon sealed up a place that was in Jerusalem, enclosed by a low wall and filled with dirt, called the Millo (mentioned in 1 Kings 11:26-32). He did this "to build within it houses for her manservants and maidservants. Concerning this Jeroboam admonished him, saying: Your father left it open for the pilgrims, and you enclosed it to make a labor force for Pharaoh’s daughter. ...the Millo he did not build for any greatness, for his father had left it for the pilgrims to pitch their tents therein, but since Pharaoh’s daughter had gone up to her house, and the Millo was adjacent to that house, then he built up the Millo."

=== The cause of Rome ===
As the Hebrew scriptures often say that Yahweh raises enemies against the people of Israel when their leaders fall into sin, a similar statement is made about the story of Solomon and his Egyptian wife. The Talmud at Sanhedrin 21b says that "When Solomon married Pharaoh's daughter, Gabriel descended and stuck a reed in the sea, which gathered a sand-bank around it, on which was built the great city of Rome."

== In the Kebra Nagast ==
According to the Kebra Nagast of the Ethiopian Orthodox Tewahedo Church, Pharaoh's daughter tricked Solomon into committing idolatry by making him swear an oath. In the text she was upset that he has slept with the Queen of Sheba and fathered Menyelek (who is held to have taken the Ark of the Covenant with him when the Queen returned with him to Africa). Solomon at first resists her calls saying "I will neither sacrifice to nor worship thine idols, and I will not perform thy wish." So "one day she beautified and scented herself for him, and she behaved herself haughtily towards him, and treated him disdainfully. And he said unto her, "What shall I do? Thou hast made thy face evil towards me, and thy regard towards me is not as it was formerly, and thy beautiful form is not as enticing as usual. Ask me, and I will give thee whatsoever thou wishest, and I will perform it for thee, so that thou mayest make thy face (or, attitude) gracious towards me as formerly"; but she held her peace and answered him never a word. And he repeated to her the words that he would do whatsoever she wished, and she said unto him, "Swear to me by the God of Israel that thou wilt not play me false." And he swore to her that he would give her whatsoever she asked for, and that he would do for her everything that she told him. And she tied a scarlet thread on the middle of the door of [the house of] her gods, and she brought three locusts and set them in the house of her gods. And she said unto Solomon, "Come to me without breaking the scarlet thread, bend thyself and kill these locusts before me and pull out their necks"; and he did so. And she said unto him, "I will henceforward do thy will, for thou hast sacrificed to my gods and hast worshipped them." Now he had done thus because of his oath, so that he might not break his oath which she had made him to swear, even though he knew that it was an offence (or, sin) to enter into the house of her gods."

== Naming the Pharaoh ==
While some scholars go so far as to attempt to name the Pharaoh's daughter, most theories try to advance a claim of identity for the name of her father that the scriptures say gave her to Solomon as a bride.

The Catholic Encyclopedia states that "The Pharaoh was probably Psieukhannit (Psebkhan) II, the last king of the 21st dynasty, who had his capitol at Zoan (Tanis), and ruled over the Delta."

Josephus in his Antiquities of the Jews states

Now to those who ask why all the kings of Egypt from Menes, who built Memphis, and was many years earlier than our forefather Abraham, until Solomon – an interval of more than one thousand three hundred years – were called Pharaōthai, taking their name from Pharaōthes, the first king to reign after the period intervening, I have thought it necessary to explain ... that Pharaō in Egyptian signifies "king"… But I believe that from childhood they had other names, and that when they became kings they changed them for that name which in their ancestral tongue signifies their royal authority. For so also the kings of Alexandria were first called by other names, but when they assumed the kingship, were named Ptolemies after the first king. And the Roman emperors also, who from their birth are known by other names, are called Caesars, receiving this title from their princely office and rank, and do not keep the names by which their fathers called them. And I think it was for this reason that Herodotus of Halicarnassus, when he says that there were three hundred and thirty kings of Egypt after Minaias, who built Memphis, did not mention their names, because they were all in common called Pharaōthai. For, after the death of these kings, a woman ruled as queen, and he gives her name as Nikaulē, making it clear that while the male kings could all have the same name, the woman could not share this, and for that reason he mentioned her by the name that naturally belonged to her. As I myself have discovered in the books of our own country that after the Pharaōthēs who was Solomon's father-in-law no king of Egypt was ever again called by this name, and that later the afore-mentioned woman as queen of Egypt and Ethiopia came to Solomon. Now about her we shall write very shortly. But I have now mentioned these matters at this point in order to make plain that our books in many things agree with those of the Egyptians.

Josephus equates the queen "Nikaulē" with the one the Bible calls the Queen of Sheba, not with the daughter of Pharaoh who was Solomon's wife, whom he mentions separately later without giving her a name (Ch. 8, 193).

A number of scholars propose that it was Pharaoh Siamun. The Egyptologist Kenneth Kitchen (and others) argue that it was Siamun who conquered Gezer and gave it to Solomon. Others such as Paul S Ash and Mark W. Chavalas disagree, and Chavalas states that "it is impossible to conclude which Egyptian monarch ruled concurrently with David and Solomon". Professor Edward Lipinski argues that Gezer, then unfortified, was destroyed late in the 10th century (and thus not contemporary with Solomon) and that the most likely Pharaoh was Shoshenq I. However, the excavators at the site Steven Ortiz and Samuel Wolff argue that the archaeological evidence indicates that Gezer was initially destroyed in the early 10th century, around the times of Siamun. Artefacts uncovered at Gezer back up the Siamun identification. A four-inch long bronze sphinx holds a tray inscribed 'Siamun, beloved of Amun'.

== Questions of Egyptologists ==
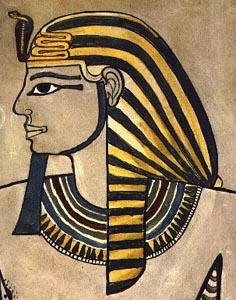
Amenhotep II followed Egyptian tradition of refusing to allow alliances through marriage with Egyptian princesses.

Some Egyptologists see a problem with the story of Solomon and Pharaoh's daughter. The issue lies in the fact that there is no record of Egyptian princesses around this time being used to form alliances through marriage. As Brian Roberts stated, "The problem is not with the synchronism of Solomon and [Pharaoh] Siamun per se, yet with the problems of attempting to fit the process of marrying out a daughter to a foreign leader. It is not a thing the ultra-orthodox Dynasty 21 would have done... We have an earlier example of the opposite, in fact. The king of the Mitanni had asked Amenhotep II for his daughter's hand in order to cement a political alliance. Amenhotep refused, offended by the suggestion that an Egyptian princess be submitted for that ridicule of being married off to a foreign leader."

Another source claims that except for the story in the Hebrew scriptures there is no other record that this happened. It states: "Royal women were married to their brothers or in some cases the father to keep the throne in the family. Royal women were never married to foreign kings or princes... There is a written account that the King of Babylon sent a princess to King Amenhotep III to marry and requested an Egyptian princess be sent to Babylon to marry him. Amenhotep III turned down the request replying, 'That since the days of old no Egyptian king’s daughter has been given to anyone.' Foreign princesses were welcomed to marry the Pharaoh but Egyptian princess did not marry foreign kings or princes. Any foreign princess that married the Pharaoh came with a large dowry and many attendants, she settled into life at the palace by taking an Egyptian name and becoming a minor (second) wife."

These claims have been countered by other Egyptologists who argue that there were some cases in which certain Pharaohs allowed their daughters to marry a foreign king. For instance, Krystal V. L. Pierce has noted the case of the Egyptian queen Dakhamunzu, who was engaged to be married to a Hittite prince. Likewise, Kenneth Kitchen also points out the case of Maatkare, who was given into marriage with the Libyan Osorkon I even before the latter ascended to kingship.

== Higher criticism ==
In the branch of literary analysis that examines the Bible, called higher criticism, the story of Solomon falling into idolatry by the influence of Pharaoh's daughter and his other foreign wives is "customarily seen as the handiwork of the 'deuteronomistic historian(s)'", who are held to have written, compiled, or edited texts to legitimize the reforms of Hezekiah's grandson, King Josiah who reigned from ca 641 BCE to 609 BCE (over 280 years after Solomon's death according to Bible scholars). Scholarly consensus in this field holds that "Solomon's wives/women were introduced in the 'Josianic' (customarily Dtr) edition of Kings as a theological construct to blame the schism [between Judah and the Northern Kingdom of Israel] on his misdeeds". These scholars hold that the "author-compiler [of 1 Kings and 2 Kings] drew upon a contemporary tradition attributing certain cultic installations (bamoth, or "high places" which were popular sites for religious pilgrims) on the Mount of Olives to Solomon (2 Kings 23:13), from which he inferred that it were Solomon's wives who had led him astray". Most scholars of higher criticism believe that an author-compiler treated a mythological account as a reflection of actual historical events, but that it was "not historical" and probably arose "in Hezekiah's era in conjunction with the reopening of the Silwan cemetery in the slopes of the Mount of Olives". These scholars hold that the "Pharaoh's daughter tradition" was also written or compiled in Hezekiah's time and may have been present in a narrative presentation of history that predated Josiah. They hold that an author-compiler living after the Babylonian Exile recast the theme of the Books of Kings "from one of too many wives/women (consistent with Deut 17:17a) to one of alien wives, reflecting the same extreme xenophobia which finally carried the day in post-Exilic Yehud (cf. Ezra 9–10; Neh 13:23–30a), when Solomon is known to have been a negative role-model in this regard (Neh 13:26); none of this material sheds any light on the 'historical Solomon'."

== In literature and music ==
=== Literature ===
Naamah, a princess of Ammon, (part of present-day Jordan) is the narrator of Aryeh Lev Stollman's novel published by Aryeh Nir/Modan (Tel Aviv) in Hebrew translation under the title Divrei Y'mai Naamah (דברי ימי נעמה). Naamah arrives in Jerusalem at age fourteen to marry King Solomon and develops a complex relationship with another wife, Pharaoh's Daughter, traveling with her to Egypt to visit the ailing Pharaoh.

=== Handel's oratorio ===
Pharaoh's daughter is a main figure in a three-act oratorio called Solomon written by the composer George Frideric Handel. It was composed "between May 5th and June 13th 1748 and it was first performed at Covent Garden on March 17th 1749". The first act deals with the dedication of the temple and Solomon's marriage to Pharaoh's daughter. The second act is about the story of his judgement between the two women both claiming the same baby. The third act is about the visit of the Queen of Sheba, "who is dazzled by his wisdom and the splendour of his court."
