= Menelik I =

Mythical Emperor of Ethiopia from c. 975 to 950 BC

Menelik I ምኒልክ
- King of Kings
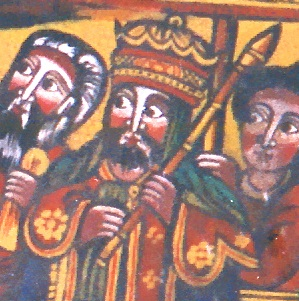
- Detail from a larger painting in the church at Axum

Emperor of Axum
- Reign: c. 975–950 BC
- Predecessor: Makeda
- Successor: Hanyon or Tomai (depending on the king list)
- Born: c. 1000 BC; Hamasien, Mai-Bela (now Asmara, Eritrea)
- Dynasty: House of Solomon
- Father: King Solomon
- Mother: Queen of Sheba

Menelik I (vocalized Ge'ez: ምኒልክ, romanized: Mənilək), was the reputed first Emperor of Ethiopia. According to the Kebra Nagast, a 14th-century national epic, in the 10th century BC he is said to have inaugurated the Solomonic dynasty, so named because Menelik I was the son of the biblical King Solomon of ancient Israel and of Makeda, the Queen of Sheba.

== Life ==
According to the medieval Ethiopian book, the Kebra Nagast, written in Ge'ez in AD 1321, Menelik's name was Bäynä Ləḥkəm (from Arabic: ابن الحكيم, Ibn Al-Hakim, "son of the wise"). He was conceived when his father Solomon tricked his visiting mother, the Queen of Sheba, into sleeping with him. His mother raised him as Jewish in her homeland, and he only traveled to Jerusalem to meet his father for the first time when he was in his twenties. While his father begged Menelik to stay and rule over Israel, Menelik told him that he wanted to return home. Thus, Solomon sent many Israelites with him, to aid him in ruling according to biblical standards; which were aggrieved at being exiled forever. One recount is that King Solomon gave the Ark of the Covenant to his son, while another states that Menelik and his Israelite companions took the Ark with them; and Solomon attempted to regain the ark but was unable to, due to its supernatural properties aiding Menelik. Upon the death of his mother, or upon her abdication in his favor, Menelik was crowned King of Axum.

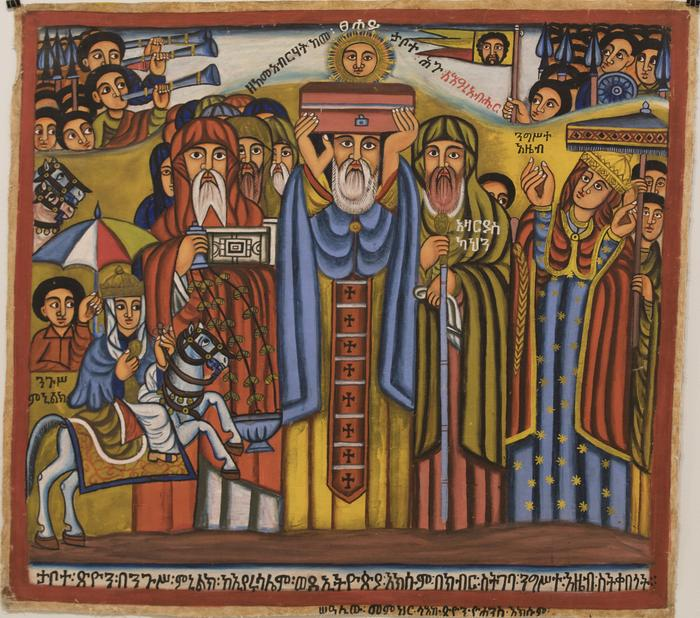
Emperor Menelik I bringing the Ark of the Covenant to Axum

Menelik was born around 1000 BC at Mai-Bela, near the village of Addi-Shmagle, located north west of Asmara, in Eritrea.

== Dynasty ==
According to legend, Menelik I founded the Solomonic dynasty. Various reigning years were given. According to Tafari Makannon's King List, he reigned from 975 BC to 950 BC in Gregorian calendar, (Note: The dates included on Tafari Makannon's king list follow the Ethiopian calendar. According to Charles Fernand Rey, the Gregorian date equivalent would be 7 or 8 years ahead.) which correspond to 982 BC to 957 BC in Ethiopian calendar. British scholar E. A. Wallis Budge suggested that he ruled from 954 BC to 930 BC

The Solomonic dynasty began (or was restored, based on the traditional narrative) in 1270, when Yekuno Amlak, who claimed descent from biblical Solomon and Sheba, overthrew the last ruler of the Zagwe dynasty, dismissing them as not of "the house of Israel" (i.e., of Solomon). and re-established the Solomonic Dynasty in 1270 AD. The term Madrā Ag'azi appears in the Gädlä Marqorewos (Conti Rossini 1904, 27 (text); 38, tr.) as the realm of King Mənəlik.

== In popular culture ==
Much Ethiopian art depicts the narrative about Menelik I in a series of panels, 44 scenes, eleven for each of four lines. The story depicted on these panels is the oral version (beginning with a backstory on Sheba and including an Ethiopian maid who also becomes pregnant by Solomon), not the medieval text version.

A short film, Menelik I, was produced in 2004. Filmed in Ethiopia, it tells the story of the son of the Queen of Sheba through tableau images and music.

== Tomb ==
A site known as the tomb of Menelik I is located two kilometres west of Axum. A German archaeological expedition discovered walls and a room at the site in 1906. Bones that were alleged to belong to Menelik I were collected and deposited in the Church of Our Lady Mary of Zion in Axum.

== Ark of the Covenant ==
According to Ethiopian tradition, the Ark of the Covenant was brought to Ethiopia by first-born sons of Israelites who accompanied Menelik on his return from Jerusalem. The Ark is believed by some people to be held in a shrine in Axum that no one is allowed to enter, except for one monk who is assigned to guard it for life and is not allowed to leave the courtyard of the church. During the persecution of Gudit in the 10th century and the Ethiopian-Adal war in the 16th century, the Ark was moved south to Lake Ziway and later brought back to Axum.

== See also ==
- Menelik II of Ethiopia
- Ark of the Covenant
- Kebra Negast
- List of monarchs of Ethiopia
