= Ulla (Talmudist) =

Jewish Talmudist

Ulla (Hebrew: עוּלָּא) was a halakhist and Amora from the Land of Israel during the late 3rd and early 4th centuries CE known for his frequent travels to and from the centers of Jewish learning in contemporary Babylonia.

== Biography ==
In his youth, Ulla studied under Rabbi Eleazar II, transmitting nine of his teacher's halakhic sayings. He was greatly respected for his learning, and during his visits to Babylonia, he seems to have been frequently invited by the Resh Galuta to deliver halakhic lectures. He traveled repeatedly to the Talmudic academies in Babylonia; on one of his journeys, he was in danger of assassination by one of his companions, saving his life only by condoning the murder of another. Ulla rendered important decisions regarding the benedictions and the calculation of the new moon and was accustomed to promulgate his rulings in Babylonia during his visits.

He was very strict in his interpretation of religious law. On one occasion, when he heard Rav Huna use an expression of which he did not approve, Ulla retorted, "As vinegar to the teeth, and as smoke to eyes, so are the words of Rav Huna." Only in the presence of Rav Nachman did Ulla hesitate to pronounce his opinions, generally waiting until Nachman had departed; at the same time, he frequently sought out Nachman's company.

Of his contemporaries with whom he engaged in controversies may be mentioned (besides Rav Nachman) Rabbi Abba, Abimi bar Papa, Hiyya bar Ammi, and Rabbi Judah. His close friend, with whom he associated most frequently, was Rabbah bar bar Hana.

In addition to the sayings of his teacher Eleazar, Ulla transmitted those of Rav Hoshaiah, Joshua ben Levi, Rabbi Johanan, Rav, and Shimon ben Lakish. His own sayings were transmitted by Rav Aḥa bar Adda, Hamnuna, Hiyya bar Abba, Hiyya bar Ammi, Ravin bar Hinana, Rav Chisda, Judah bar Ammi, and Joshua bar Abba.

Raba appears to have been his only son. Ulla died in Babylonia before his teacher Rabbi Eleazar; his remains were taken to Palestine for burial.

== Quotes ==
- "Jerusalem is only redeemed by tzedakah."
- "Since the time of the Temple's destruction, the Holy One, blessed be He, has nothing in His world save only four cubits of Halakha! (i.e., the Divine Presence is found wherever Israel observes Jewish law)."
