= Nadia Nurhussein =

American academic and author

- Born: 1974 (age 51–52)

Academic background
- Education: University of California, Berkeley (PhD)

Academic work
- Discipline: English language, Africana studies
- Sub-discipline: African-American literature, poetics
- Institutions: University of Massachusetts Boston; Johns Hopkins University

Nadia Nurhussein (born 1974) is an American academic and author specialized in African-American literature, culture, and poetics. She is an associate professor of English and Africana studies at the Johns Hopkins Zanvyl Krieger School of Arts and Sciences.

== Education ==
Nurhussein completed a Ph.D. in English at University of California, Berkeley in 2004. She received fellowships from the Ford Foundation, Beinecke Library, and the American Council of Learned Societies.

== Career ==
Nurhussein taught English at Mount Holyoke College from 2004 to 2005. She was a member of the faculty at University of Massachusetts Boston where she taught English from 2005 to 2016. In 2017, Nurhussein joined the Johns Hopkins Zanvyl Krieger School of Arts and Sciences as an associate professor of English and Africana studies. She specializes in African-American literature, culture, and poetics.

== Selected works ==
- Nurhussein, Nadia (2013). Rhetorics of Literacy: The Cultivation of American Dialect Poetry. Ohio State University Press. ISBN 978-0-8142-1216-5.
- Nurhussein, Nadia (2019). Black Land: Imperial Ethiopianism and African America. Princeton University Press. ISBN 978-0-691-19096-9.
