= Mishpatim =

Eighteenth portion in the annual Jewish cycle of weekly Torah reading

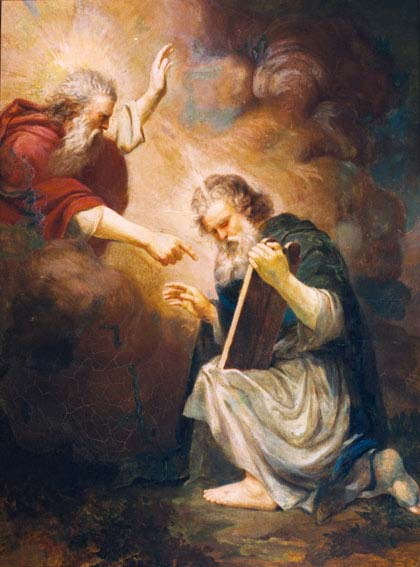
Moses Receives the Tablets of the Law (1868 painting by João Zeferino da Costa)

Mishpatim (מִּשְׁפָּטִים—Hebrew for "laws"; the second word of the parashah) is the eighteenth weekly Torah portion (פָּרָשָׁה, parashah) in the annual Jewish cycle of Torah reading and the sixth in the Book of Exodus. The parashah sets out a series of laws, which some scholars call the Covenant Code. It reports the Israelites' acceptance of the covenant with God. The parashah constitutes Exodus 21:1–24:18. The parashah is made up of 5,313 Hebrew letters, 1,462 Hebrew words, 118 verses, and 185 lines in a Torah scroll (סֵפֶר תּוֹרָה, Sefer Torah).

Jews read it on the eighteenth Shabbat after Simchat Torah, generally in February or, rarely, in late January. As the parashah sets out some of the laws of Passover, one of the three Shalosh Regalim, Jews also read part of the parashah (Exodus 22:24–23:19) as the initial Torah reading for the second intermediate day (חוֹל הַמּוֹעֵד, Chol HaMoed) of Passover. Jews also read the first part of Parashat Ki Tisa (Exodus 30:11–16) regarding the half-shekel head tax, as the maftir Torah reading on the special Sabbath Shabbat Shekalim, which often falls on the same Shabbat as Parashat Mishpatim (as it will in 2026, 2028, and 2029).

== Readings ==
In traditional Sabbath Torah reading, the parashah is divided into seven readings, or עליות, aliyot.

=== First reading—Exodus 21:1–19 ===
The first reading addresses laws on Hebrew indentured servants and slaves, homicide, striking a parent, kidnapping, insulting a parent, and assault.

=== Second reading—Exodus 21:20–22:3 ===
The second reading addresses laws on assault, a homicidal animal, damage to livestock, and theft.

=== Third reading—Exodus 22:4–26 ===
The third reading addresses laws on damage to crops, bailment, seduction, sorcery, bestiality, apostasy, wronging the disadvantaged, lending, and taking someone's property as a pledge.

=== Fourth reading—Exodus 22:27–23:5 ===
The fourth reading addresses laws on duties to God, judicial integrity, and humane treatment of an enemy and his property.

=== Fifth reading—Exodus 23:6–19 ===
The fifth reading addresses laws concerning the disadvantaged, false charges, bribery, oppressing the stranger, the sabbatical year for crops (שמיטה, Shmita), the Sabbath, the mention of other gods, the Three Pilgrimage Festivals (שָׁלוֹשׁ רְגָלִים, Shalosh Regalim), sacrifice (קָרְבָּן, korban), and firstfruits (ביכורים, Bikkurim).

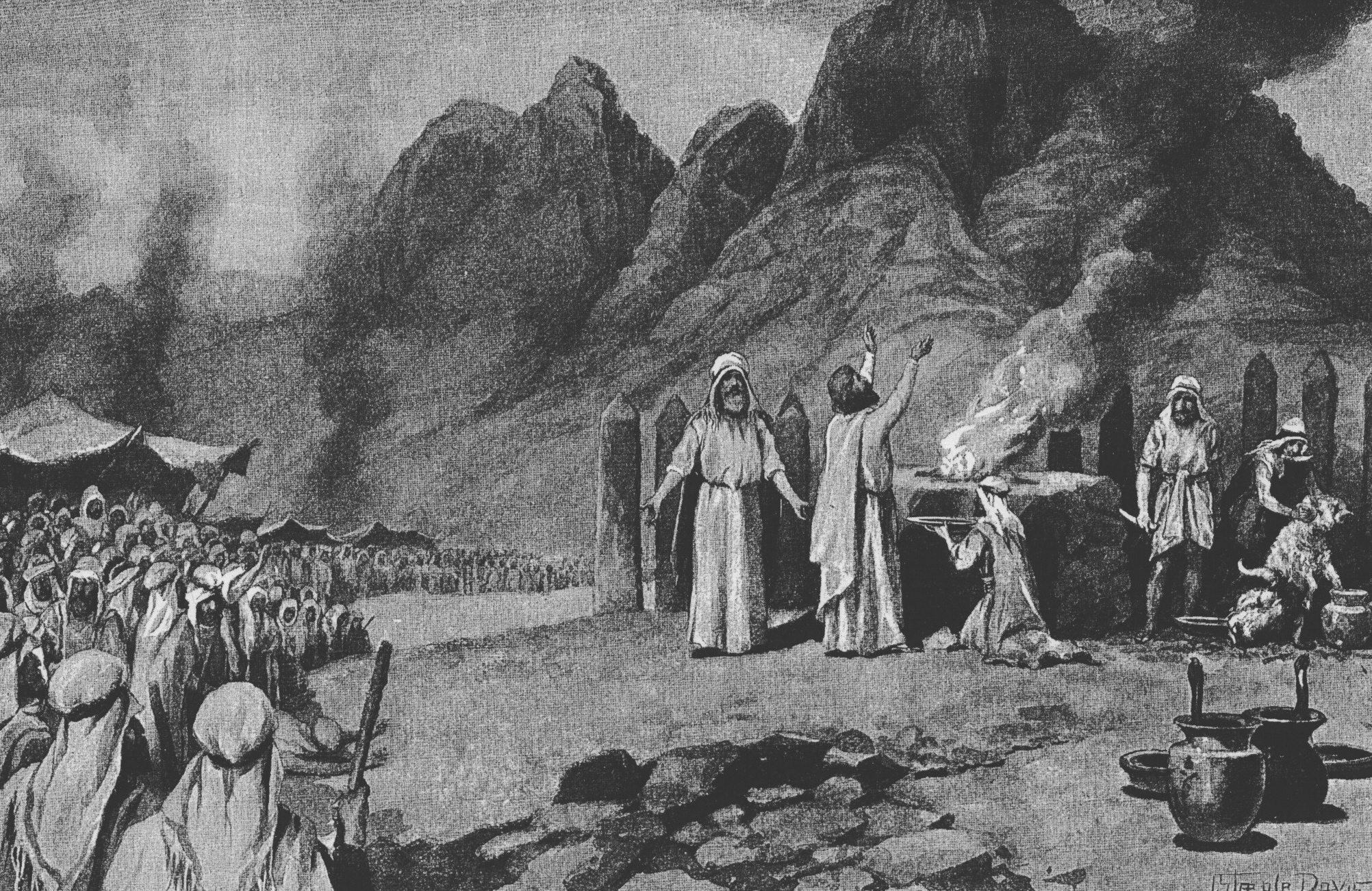
The Covenant Confirmed (late 19th or early 20th Century illustration by John Steeple Davis)

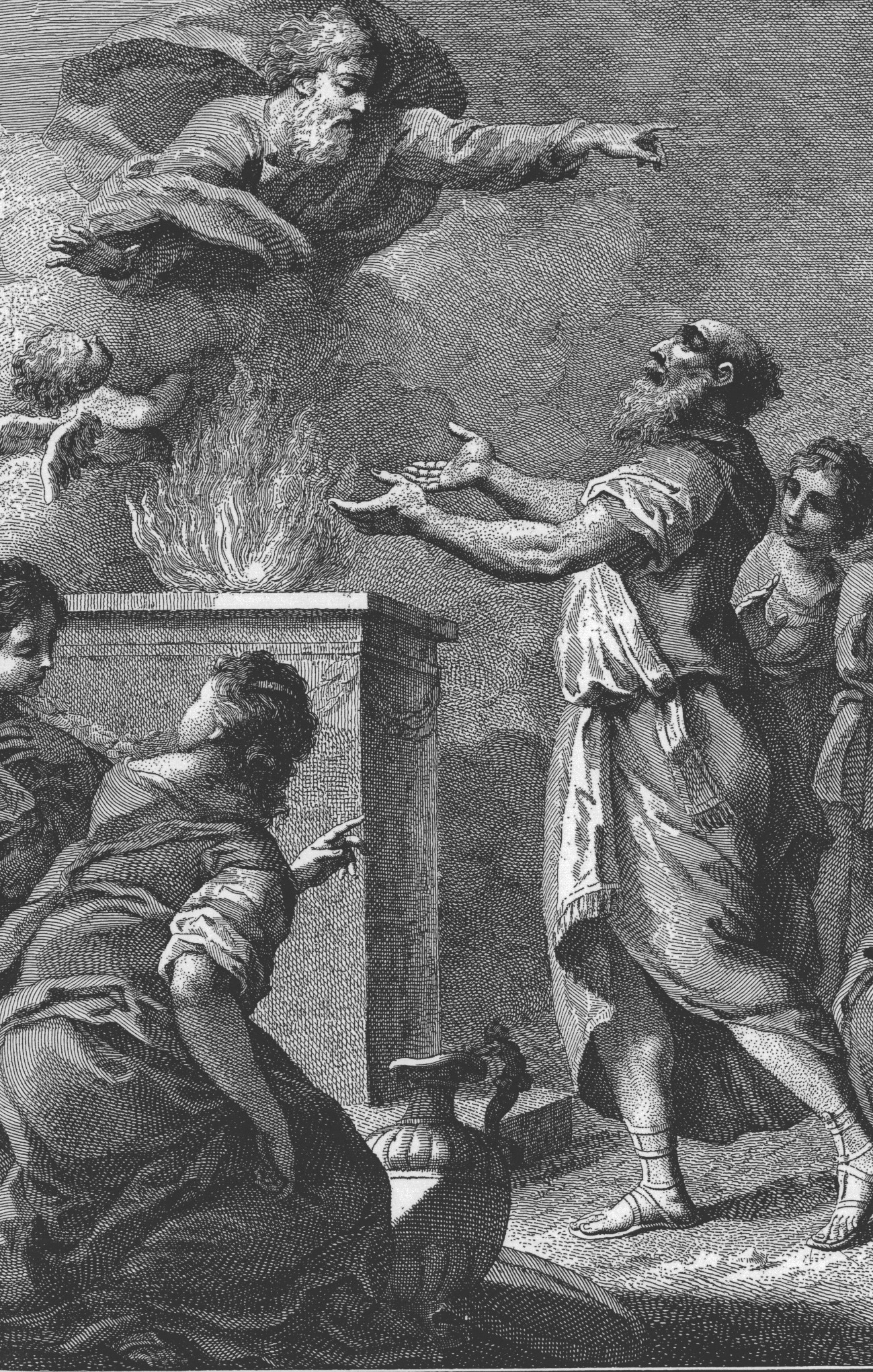
Moses and the Elders See God (early 18th Century illustration by Jacopo Amigoni)

=== Sixth reading—Exodus 23:20–25 ===
In the short sixth reading, God promised to send an angel with the Israelites to bring them to the place God had prepared. God directed the Israelites to obey the angel, for if they did, then God would be an enemy to their enemies. The Israelites were not to serve other gods, but to serve only God.

=== Seventh reading—Exodus 23:26–24:18 ===
In the seventh reading, God promised reward for obedience to God. God invited Moses, Aaron, Nadab and Abihu, and 70 elders to bow to God from afar. Moses repeated the commandments to the people, who answered: "All the things that the Lord has commanded we will do!" Moses then wrote the commandments down. He set up an altar and some young Israelite men offered sacrifices. Moses read the Book of the Covenant aloud to the people, who once again affirmed that they would follow it. Moses took blood from the sacrifices and dashed it on the people. Moses, Aaron, Nadab, Abihu, and the 70 elders of Israel then ascended, saw God, ate, and drank. Moses and Joshua arose, and Moses ascended Mount Sinai, leaving Aaron and Hur in charge. A cloud covered the mountain, hiding the Presence of the Lord for six days, appearing to the Israelites as a fire on the top of the mountain. Moses went inside the cloud and remained on the mountain for 40 days and nights.

=== Readings according to the triennial cycle ===
Jews who read the Torah according to the triennial cycle of Torah reading read the parashah according to the following schedule:

	Year 1	Year 2	Year 3
	2023, 2026, 2029 . . .	2024, 2027, 2030 . . .	2025, 2028, 2031 . . .
Reading	21:1–22:3	22:4–23:19	23:20–24:18
1	21:1–6	22:4–8	23:20–25
2	21:7–11	22:9–12	23:26–30
3	21:12–19	22:13–18	23:31–33
4	21:20–27	22:19–26	24:1–6
5	21:28–32	22:27–23:5	24:7–11
6	21:33–36	23:6–13	24:12–14
7	21:37–22:3	23:14–19	24:15–18
Maftir	21:37–22:3	23:14–19	24:15–18

== In ancient parallels ==
The parashah has parallels in these ancient sources:

=== Exodus chapters 21–22 ===
The laws in the parashah find parallels in several ancient law codes.

Topic of Law	In Exodus 21–23	In Ancient Parallels
Debt Slavery	Exodus 21:2: If you buy a Hebrew servant, six years he shall serve; and in the seventh he shall go out free for nothing.	Hammurabi's Code Code of Hammurabi 117 (1750 BCE): If anyone fails to meet a claim for debt, and sells himself, his wife, his son, and daughter for money or gives them away to forced labor: They shall work for three years in the house of the man who bought them, or the proprietor, and in the fourth year they shall be set free.
The Maid-Servant-Wife	Exodus 21:7–11: ^{7}And if a man sells his daughter to be a maid-servant, she shall not go out as the men-servants do. ^{8}If she does not please her master, who has espoused her to himself, then he shall let her be redeemed; he shall have no power to sell her to a foreign people, seeing he has dealt deceitfully with her. ^{9}And if he espouses her to his son, he shall deal with her after the manner of daughters. ^{10}If he takes another wife, he shall not diminish her food, her clothing, and her conjugal rights. ^{11}And if he does not give her these three, then she shall go out for nothing, without money.	Code of Hammurabi 146–47 (1750 BCE): ^{146}If a man takes a wife and she gives this man a maid-servant as wife and she bears him children, and then this maid assumes equality with the wife: because she has borne him children, her master shall not sell her for money, but he may keep her as a slave, reckoning her among the maid-servants. ^{147}If she has not borne him children, then her mistress may sell her for money.
Homicide	Exodus 21:12–14: ^{12}He who strikes a man, so that he dies, shall surely be put to death. ^{13}And if a man does not lie in wait, but God causes it to come to hand; then I will appoint you a place to which he may flee. ^{14}And if a man comes presumptuously upon his neighbor, to slay him with guile; you shall take him from My altar, that he may die.	Code of Ur-Nammu Code of Ur-Nammu 1 (2100 BCE): If a man commits a murder, that man must be killed. Code of Hammurabi 206–208 (1750 BCE): ^{206}If during a quarrel one man strikes another and wounds him, then he shall swear, "I did not injure him wittingly," and pay the physicians. ^{207}If the man dies of his wound, he shall swear similarly, and if he (the deceased) was a free-born man, he shall pay half a mina in money. ^{208}If he was a freed man, he shall pay one-third of a mina.
A Fight	Exodus 21:18–19: ^{18}And if men contend, and one strikes the other with a stone, or with his fist, and he does not die, but keeps his bed; ^{19}if he rises again, and walks abroad on his staff, then he who struck him shall go free; only he shall pay for the loss of his time, and shall cause him to be thoroughly healed.	Code of Hammurabi 206 (1750 BCE): If during a quarrel one man strikes another and wounds him, then he shall swear, "I did not injure him wittingly," and pay the physicians. Hittite Laws 10 (1500 BCE): If anyone injures a man so that he causes him suffering, he shall take care of him. Yet he shall give him a man in his place, who shall look after his house until he recovers. But if he recovers, he shall give him six shekels of silver. And to the physician this one shall also give the fee.
Assault on a Debt Slave	Exodus 21:20–21: ^{20}And if a man strikes his bondman, or his bondwoman, with a rod, and he dies under his hand, he shall surely be punished. ^{21}Notwithstanding if he continue a day or two, he shall not be punished; for he is his property.	Code of Hammurabi 115–116 (1750 BCE): ^{115}If anyone has a claim for grain or money upon another and imprisons him; if the prisoner dies in prison a natural death, the case shall go no further. ^{116}If the prisoner dies in prison from blows or maltreatment, the master of the prisoner shall convict the merchant before the judge. If he was a free-born man, the son of the merchant shall be put to death; if it was a slave, he shall pay one-third of a mina of gold, and all that the master of the prisoner gave he shall forfeit.
Harm to a Pregnant Woman	Exodus 21:20–25: ^{22}And if men strive together, and hurt a woman with child, so that her fruit depart, and yet no harm follows, he shall surely be fined, according as the woman's husband shall lay upon him; and he shall pay as the judges determine. ^{23}But if any harm follows, then you shall give life for life, ^{24}eye for eye, tooth for tooth, hand for hand, foot for foot, ^{25}burning for burning, wound for wound, stripe for stripe.	Sumerian Code 1 (1800 BCE): If one father of one household accidentally strikes the daughter of another, other, and she miscarries, then the fine is ten shekels. Code of Hammurabi 209–214 (1750 BCE): ^{209}If a man strikes a free-born woman so that she loses her unborn child, he shall pay ten shekels for her loss. ^{210}If the woman dies, his daughter shall be put to death. ^{211}If a woman of the free class loses her child by a blow, he shall pay five shekels in money. ^{212}If this woman dies, he shall pay half a mina. ^{213}If he strikes the maid-servant of a man, and she loses her child, he shall pay two shekels in money. ^{214}If this maid-servant dies, he shall pay one-third of a mina. Hittite Laws Hittite Laws 17–18 (1500 BCE): ^{17}If anyone causes a free woman to miscarry, [if] it is her tenth month, he shall pay 10 shekels of silver, if it is her fifth month, he shall pay 5 shekels of silver. He shall look to his house for it. ^{18}If anyone causes a female slave to miscarry, if it is her tenth month, he shall pay 5 shekels of silver. Middle Assyrian Laws 50–52 (1200 BCE): ^{50}If a man struck a married woman and caused her to miscarry, the striker's wife will be treated in the same way: He will pay for the unborn child on the principle of a life for a life. But if (the first) woman died, the man is to be executed: he will pay for the unborn child on the principle of a life for a life. If (the first) woman's husband has no son, and she has been struck causing a miscarriage, the striker will be executed, even if the child was a girl: He will still pay for the unborn child on the principle of a life for a life. ^{51}If a man struck a married woman who does not rear her children and caused her to miscarry, he is to pay two talents of lead. ^{52}If a man struck a harlot and caused her to miscarry, he is to be struck with the same number and type of blows: In this way he will pay on the principle of a life for a life.
An Eye for an Eye	Exodus 21:23–25: ^{23}But if any harm follows, then you shall give life for life, ^{24}eye for eye, tooth for tooth, hand for hand, foot for foot, ^{25}burning for burning, wound for wound, stripe for stripe.	Laws of Eshnunna 42–43 (1800 BCE): ^{42}If a man bites the nose of another man and thus cuts it off, he shall weigh and deliver 60 shekels of silver; an eye—60 shekels; a tooth—30 shekels; an ear—30 shekels; a slap to the cheek—he shall weigh and deliver 10 shekels of silver. ^{43}If a man should cut off the finger of another man, he shall weigh and deliver 40 shekels of silver. Code of Hammurabi 196–201 (1750 BCE): ^{196}If a man puts out the eye of another man, his eye shall be put out. ^{197}If he breaks another man's bone, his bone shall be broken. ^{198}If he puts out the eye of a freed man, or breaks the bone of a freed man, he shall pay one gold mina. ^{199}If he puts out the eye of a man's slave, or breaks the bone of a man's slave, he shall pay one-half of its value. ^{200}If a man knocks out the teeth of his equal, his teeth shall be knocked out. ^{201}If he knocks out the teeth of a freed man, he shall pay one-third of a gold mina.
An Ox that Gores	Exodus 21:28–36: ^{28}And if an ox gores a man or a woman, that they die, the ox shall surely be stoned, and its flesh shall not be eaten; but the owner of the ox shall go free. ^{29}But if the ox was wont to gore in times past, and warning has been given to its owner, and he has not kept it in, but it has killed a man or a woman; the ox shall be stoned, and its owner also shall be put to death. ^{30}If there is laid on him a ransom, then he shall give for the redemption of his life whatever is laid upon him. ^{31}Whether it has gored a son, or has gored a daughter, according to this judgment shall it be done to him. ^{32}If the ox gores a bondman or a bondwoman, he shall give to their master 30 shekels of silver, and the ox shall be stoned. . . . ^{35}And if one man's ox hurts another's, so that it dies; then they shall sell the live ox, and divide the price of it; and the dead also they shall divide. ^{36}Or if it be known that the ox was wont to gore in times past, and its owner has not kept it in; he shall surely pay ox for ox, and the dead beast shall be his own.	Laws of Eshnunna 53–55 (1800 BCE): ^{53}If an ox gores another ox and thus causes its death, the two ox-owners shall divide the value of the living ox and the carcass of the dead ox. ^{54}If an ox is a gorer and the ward authorities so notify the owner, but he fails to keep his ox in check, and it gores a man and thus causes his death, the owner of the ox shall weigh and deliver 40 shekels of silver. ^{55}If it gores a slave and thus causes his death, he shall weigh and deliver 15 shekels of silver. Code of Hammurabi 251–252 (1750 BCE): ^{251}If an ox is a goring ox, and it is shown that he is a gorer, and he does not bind his horns, or fasten the ox up, and the ox gores a free-born man and kills him, the owner shall pay one-half a mina in money. ^{252}If he kills a man's slave, he shall pay one-third of a mina.
Son or Daughter	Exodus 21:31: Whether it has gored a son, or has gored a daughter, according to this judgment shall it be done to him.	Code of Hammurabi 229–231 (1750 BCE): ^{229}If a builder builds a house for someone, and does not construct it properly, and the house that he built falls in and kills its owner, then that builder shall be put to death. ^{230}If it kills the son of the owner, the son of that builder shall be put to death. ^{231}If it kills a slave of the owner, then he shall pay slave for slave to the owner of the house.

== In inner-biblical interpretation ==
The parashah has parallels or is discussed in these Biblical sources:

=== Exodus chapters 21–23 ===
Benjamin Sommer argued that Deuteronomy 12–26 borrowed whole sections from the earlier text of Exodus 21–23.

=== Exodus chapter 21 ===
The parashah opens in Exodus 21:1 with the words, "these are the ordinances (הַמִּשְׁפָּטִים, ha-mishpatim) that you shall set before them." Exodus 24:3 then echoes, "Moses came and told the people . . . all the ordinances (הַמִּשְׁפָּטִים, ha-mishpatim)," and then "all the people answered with one voice, and said: 'All the words that the Lord has spoken will we do.'"

In three separate places—Exodus 21:22–25; Leviticus 24:19–21; and Deuteronomy 19:16–21—the Torah sets forth the law of "an eye for an eye."

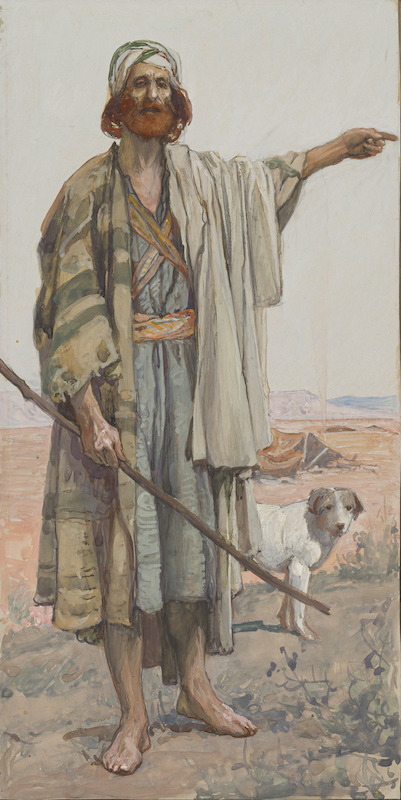
Amos

=== Exodus chapter 22 ===
Exodus 22:20 admonishes the Israelites not to wrong the stranger, "for you were strangers in the land of Egypt". Similarly, in Amos 3:1, the 8th century BCE prophet Amos anchored his pronouncements in the covenant community's Exodus history, saying, "Hear this word that the Lord has spoken against you, O children of Israel, against the whole family that I brought up out of the land of Egypt."

Exodus 22:24 invokes the wrath of God, a frequently-invoked concept in the Torah, on those who would afflict any widow, or fatherless child.

Exodus 22:25–26 admonishes: "If you take your neighbor's garment in pledge, you must return it to him before the sun sets; it is his only clothing, the sole covering for his skin." Similarly, in Amos 2:8, Amos condemned people of Judah who "recline by every altar on garments taken in pledge".

=== Exodus chapter 23 ===
==== Passover ====
Exodus 23:15 refers to the Festival of Passover. In the Hebrew Bible, Passover is called:

- "Passover" (פֶּסַח, Pesach);
- "The Feast of Unleavened Bread" (חַג הַמַּצּוֹת, Chag haMatzot); and
- "A holy convocation" or "a solemn assembly" (מִקְרָא-קֹדֶשׁ, mikrah kodesh).

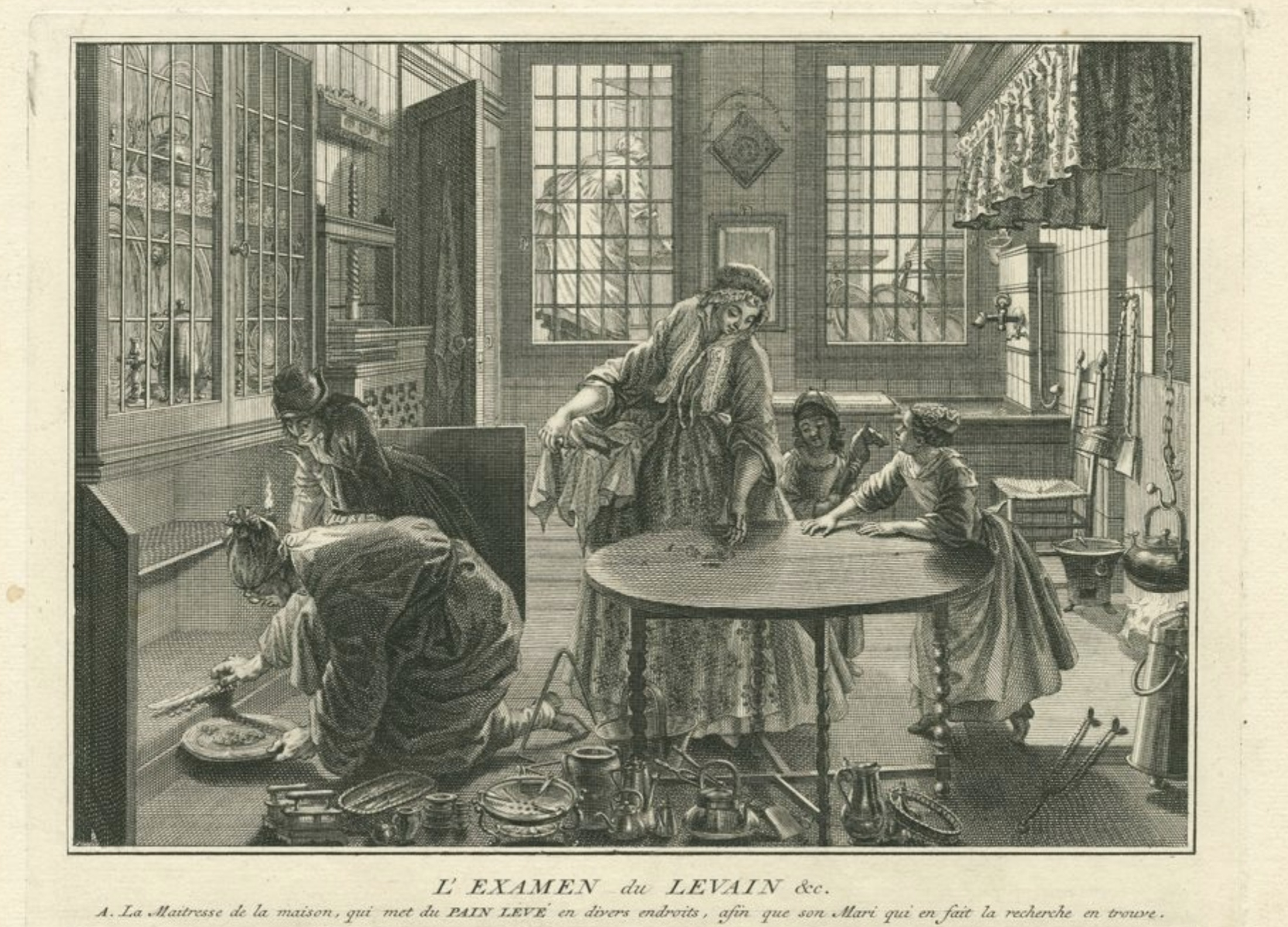
The Search for Leaven (copper engraving by Bernard Picart, 1732)

Some explain the double nomenclature of "Passover" and "Feast of Unleavened Bread" as referring to two separate feasts that the Israelites combined sometime between the Exodus and when the Biblical text became settled. Exodus 34:18–20 and Deuteronomy 15:19–16:8 indicate that the dedication of the firstborn also became associated with the festival.

Some believe that the "Feast of Unleavened Bread" was an agricultural festival at which the Israelites celebrated the beginning of the grain harvest. Moses may have had this festival in mind when in Exodus 5:1 and 10:9 he petitioned Pharaoh to let the Israelites go to celebrate a feast in the wilderness.

"Passover," on the other hand, was associated with a thanksgiving sacrifice of a lamb, also called "the Passover," "the Passover lamb," or "the Passover offering."

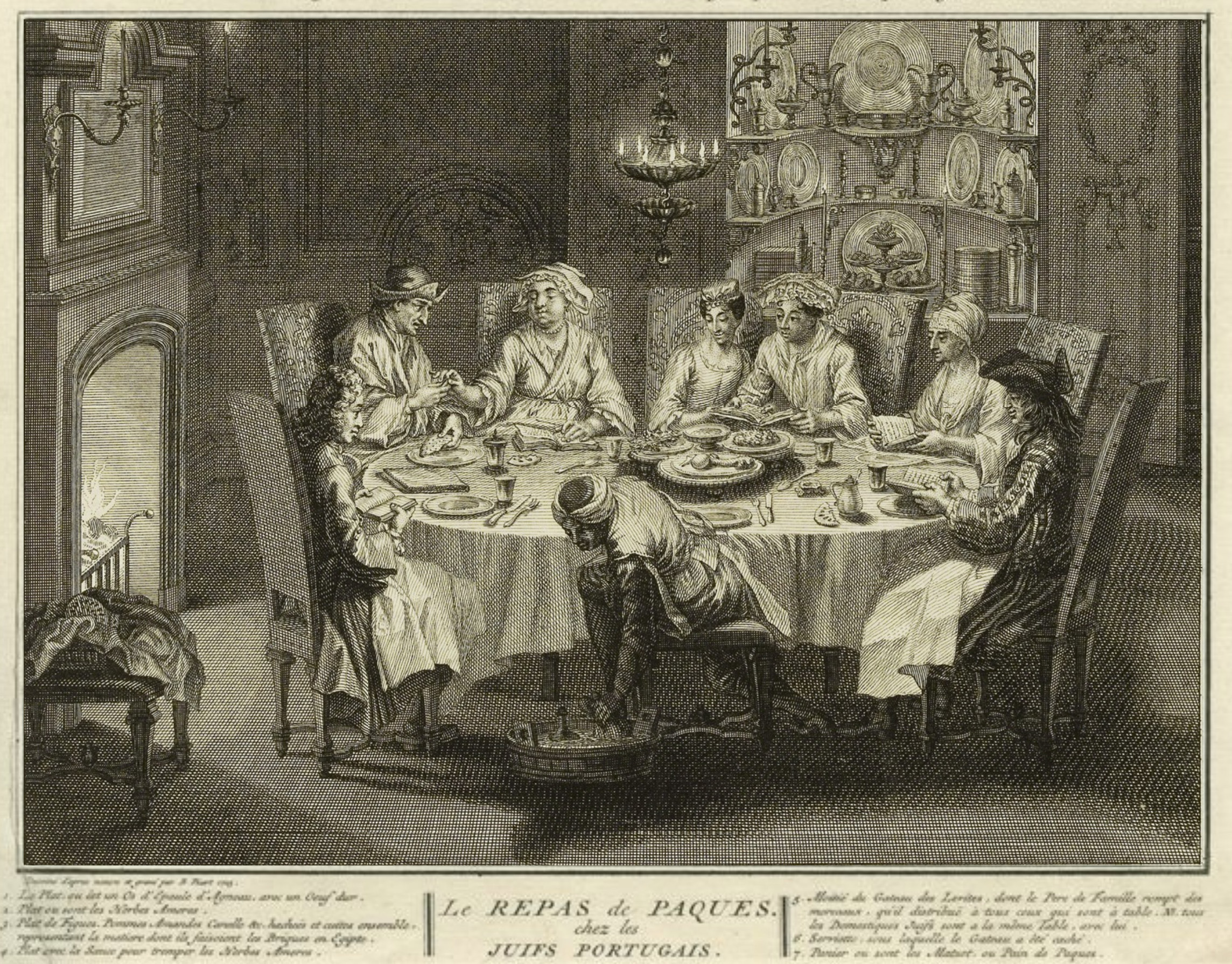
The Passover Seder of the Portuguese Jews (illustration circa 1733–1739 by Bernard Picart)

Exodus 12:5–6, Leviticus 23:5, and Numbers 9:3 and 5, and 28:16 direct "Passover" to take place on the evening of the fourteenth of Aviv (Nisan in the Hebrew calendar after the Babylonian captivity). Joshua 5:10, Ezekiel 45:21, Ezra 6:19, and 2 Chronicles 35:1 confirm that practice. Exodus 12:18–19, 23:15, and 34:18, Leviticus 23:6, and Ezekiel 45:21 direct the "Feast of Unleavened Bread" to take place over seven days and Leviticus 23:6 and Ezekiel 45:21 direct that it begin on the fifteenth of the month. Some believe that the propinquity of the dates of the two Festivals led to their confusion and merger.

Exodus 12:23 and 27 link the word "Passover" (פֶּסַח, Pesach) to God's act to "pass over" (פָסַח, pasach) the Israelites' houses in the plague of the firstborn. In the Torah, the consolidated Passover and Feast of Unleavened Bread thus commemorate the Israelites' liberation from Egypt.

The Hebrew Bible frequently notes the Israelites' observance of Passover at turning points in their history. Numbers 9:1–5 reports God's direction to the Israelites to observe Passover in the wilderness of Sinai on the anniversary of their liberation from Egypt. Joshua 5:10–11 reports that upon entering the Promised Land, the Israelites kept the Passover on the plains of Jericho and ate unleavened cakes and parched grain, produce of the land, the next day. 2 Kings 23:21–23 reports that King Josiah commanded the Israelites to keep the Passover in Jerusalem as part of Josiah's reforms, but also notes that the Israelites had not kept such a Passover from the days of the Biblical judges nor in all the days of the kings of Israel or the kings of Judah, calling into question the observance of even Kings David and Solomon. The more reverent 2 Chronicles 8:12–13, however, reports that Solomon offered sacrifices on the Festivals, including the Feast of Unleavened Bread. And 2 Chronicles 30:1–27 reports King Hezekiah's observance of a second Passover anew, as sufficient numbers of neither the priests nor the people were prepared to do so before then. And Ezra 6:19–22 reports that the Israelites returned from the Babylonian captivity observed Passover, ate the Passover lamb, and kept the Feast of Unleavened Bread seven days with joy.

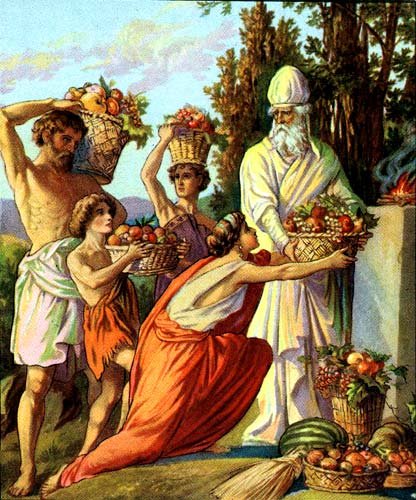
offering of firstfruits (illustration from a Bible card published between 1896 and 1913 by the Providence Lithograph Company)

==== Shavuot ====
Exodus 23:16 refers to the Festival of Shavuot. In the Hebrew Bible, Shavuot is called:

- The Feast of Weeks (חַג שָׁבֻעֹת, Chag Shavuot);
- The Day of the Firstfruits (יוֹם הַבִּכּוּרִים, Yom haBikurim);
- The Feast of Harvest (חַג הַקָּצִיר, Chag haKatzir); and
- A holy convocation (מִקְרָא-קֹדֶשׁ, mikrah kodesh).

Exodus 34:22 associates Shavuot with the firstfruits (בִּכּוּרֵי, bikurei) of the wheat harvest. In turn, Deuteronomy 26:1–11 set out the ceremony for the bringing of the firstfruits.

To arrive at the correct date, Leviticus 23:15 instructs counting seven weeks from the day after the day of rest of Passover, the day that they brought the sheaf of barley for waving. Similarly, Deuteronomy 16:9 directs counting seven weeks from when they first put the sickle to the standing barley.

Leviticus 23:16–19 sets out a course of offerings for the fiftieth day, including a meal-offering of two loaves made from fine flour from the firstfruits of the harvest; burnt-offerings of seven lambs, one bullock, and two rams; a sin-offering of a goat; and a peace-offering of two lambs. Similarly, Numbers 28:26–30 sets out a course of offerings including a meal-offering; burnt-offerings of two bullocks, one ram, and seven lambs; and one goat to make atonement. Deuteronomy 16:10 directs a freewill-offering in relation to God's blessing.

Leviticus 23:21 and Numbers 28:26 ordain a holy convocation in which the Israelites were not to work.

2 Chronicles 8:13 reports that Solomon offered burnt-offerings on the Feast of Weeks.

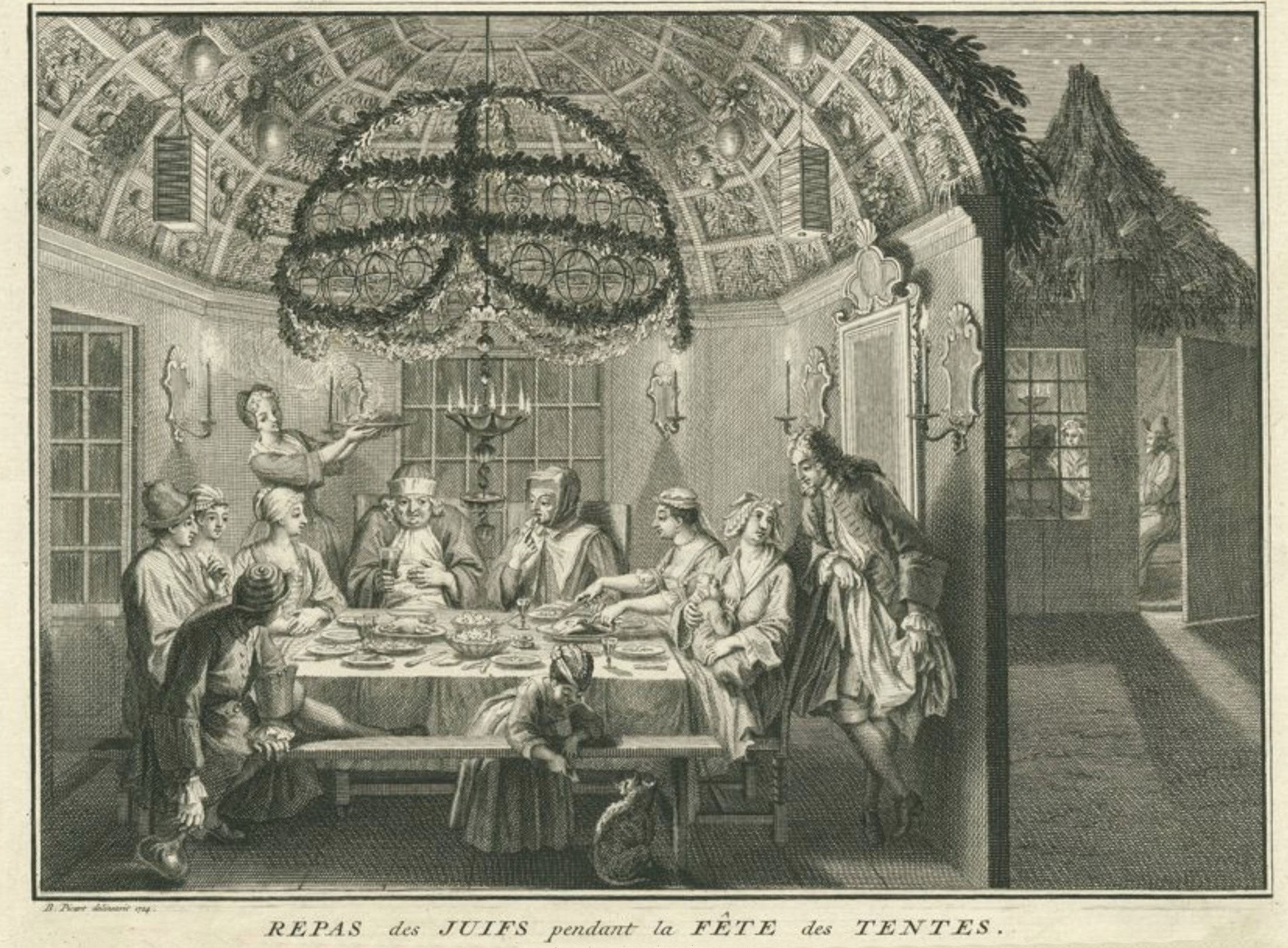
Sukkot family meal eaten in a sukkah with foliage roof and chandelier (engraving by Bernard Picart, 1724)

==== Sukkot ====
Exodus 23:16 refers to the Festival of Sukkot. In the Hebrew Bible, Sukkot is called:

- "The Feast of Tabernacles (or Booths)";
- "The Feast of Ingathering";
- "The Feast" or "the festival";
- "The Feast of the Lord";
- "The festival of the seventh month"; and
- "A holy convocation" or "a sacred occasion".

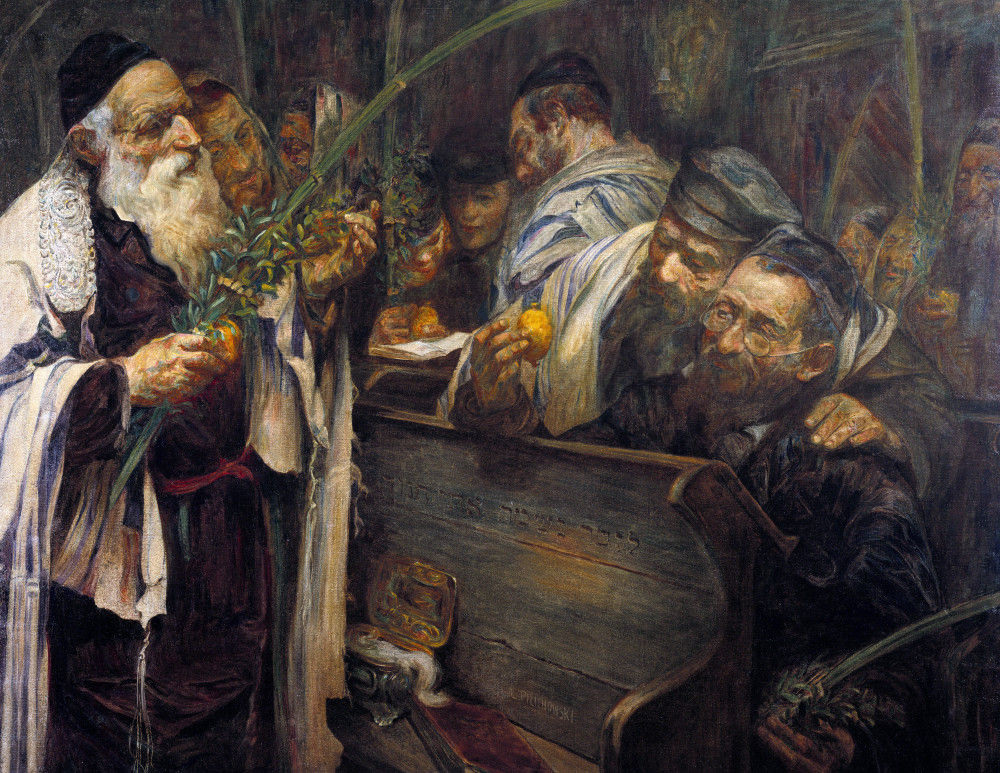
Celebrating Sukkot with the Four Species (painting circa 1894–1895 by Leopold Pilichowski)

Sukkot's agricultural origin is evident from the name "The Feast of Ingathering", from the ceremonies accompanying it, and from the season and occasion of its celebration: "At the end of the year when you gather in your labors out of the field"; "after you have gathered in from your threshing-floor and from your winepress." It was a thanksgiving for the fruit harvest. And in what may explain the festival's name, Isaiah reports that grape harvesters kept booths in their vineyards. Coming as it did at the completion of the harvest, Sukkot was regarded as a general thanksgiving for the bounty of nature in the year that had passed.

Sukkot became one of the most important feasts in Judaism, as indicated by its designation as "the Feast of the Lord" or simply "the Feast." Perhaps because of its wide attendance, Sukkot became the appropriate time for important state ceremonies. Moses instructed the children of Israel to gather for a reading of the Law during Sukkot every seventh year. King Solomon dedicated the Temple in Jerusalem on Sukkot. And Sukkot was the first sacred occasion observed after the resumption of sacrifices in Jerusalem after the Babylonian captivity.

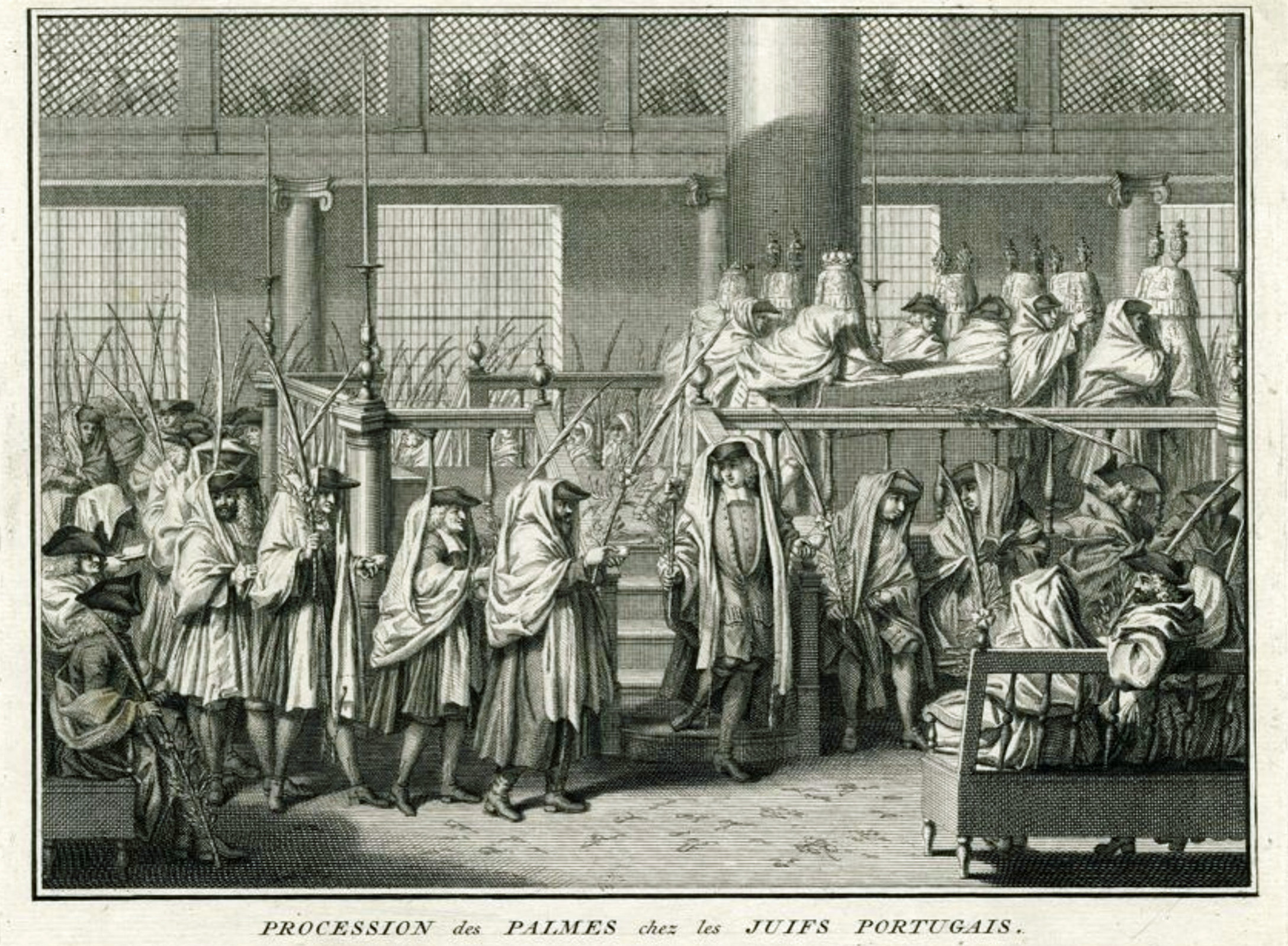
Observance of Sukkot; Procession of the Palms [Hoshanah Rabbah] in the Portuguese Synagogue in Amsterdam (engraving by Bernard Picart, 1724)

In the time of Nehemiah, after the Babylonian captivity, the Israelites celebrated Sukkot by making and dwelling in booths, a practice of which Nehemiah reports: "the Israelites had not done so from the days of Joshua." In a practice related to that of the Four Species, Nehemiah also reports that the Israelites found in the Law the commandment that they "go out to the mountains and bring leafy branches of olive trees, pine trees, myrtles, palms and [other] leafy trees to make booths." In Leviticus 23:40, God told Moses to command the people: "On the first day you shall take the product of hadar trees, branches of palm trees, boughs of leafy trees, and willows of the brook," and "You shall live in booths seven days; all citizens in Israel shall live in booths, in order that future generations may know that I made the Israelite people live in booths when I brought them out of the land of Egypt." The book of Numbers, however, indicates that while in the wilderness, the Israelites dwelt in tents. Some scholars consider Leviticus 23:39–43 (the commandments regarding booths and the four species) to be an insertion by a late redactor.

Jeroboam son of Nebat, King of the northern Kingdom of Israel, whom 1 Kings 13:33 describes as practicing "his evil way," celebrated a festival on the fifteenth day of the eighth month, one month after Sukkot, "in imitation of the festival in Judah." "While Jeroboam was standing on the altar to present the offering, the man of God, at the command of the Lord, cried out against the altar" in disapproval.

According to Zechariah, in the messianic era, Sukkot will become a universal festival, and all nations will make pilgrimages annually to Jerusalem to celebrate the feast there.

==== Milk ====
In three separate places—Exodus 23:19 and 34:26 and Deuteronomy 14:21—the Torah prohibits boiling a kid in its mother's milk.

==== Stone pillars ====
In Genesis 28:18, Jacob took the stone on which he had slept, set it up as a pillar (מַצֵּבָה, matzeivah), and poured oil on the top of it. Exodus 23:24 would later direct the Israelites to break in pieces the Canaanites' pillars (מַצֵּבֹתֵיהֶם, matzeivoteihem). Leviticus 26:1 would direct the Israelites not to rear up a pillar (מַצֵּבָה, matzeivah). And Deuteronomy 16:22 would prohibit them to set up a pillar (מַצֵּבָה, tzevahma), "which the Lord your God hates."

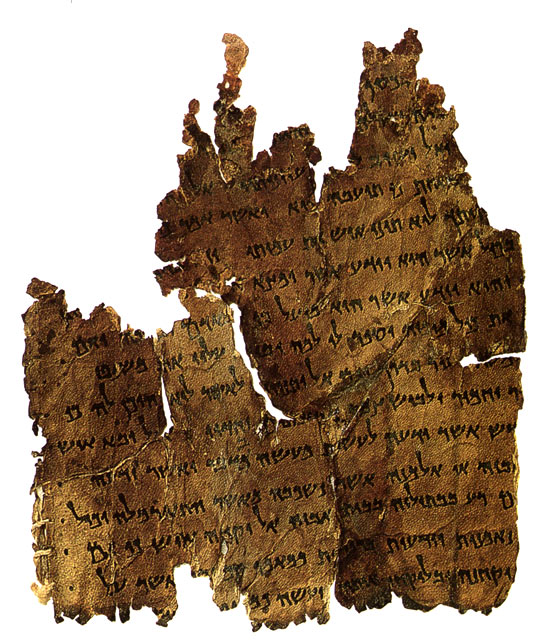
A Damascus Document Scroll found at Qumran

== In early nonrabbinic interpretation ==
The parashah has parallels or is discussed in these early nonrabbinic sources:

=== Exodus chapter 22 ===
The Damascus Document of the Qumran community prohibited non-cash transactions with Jews who were not members of the community. Lawrence Schiffman read this regulation as an attempt to avoid violating prohibitions on charging interest to one's fellow Jew in Exodus 22:25, Leviticus 25:36–37, and Deuteronomy 23:19–20. Apparently, the Qumran community viewed prevailing methods of conducting business through credit to violate those laws.

=== Exodus chapter 23 ===
One of the Dead Sea Scrolls, the Community Rule of the Qumran sectarians, cited Exodus 23:7, "Keep far from a deceitful matter," to support a prohibition of business partnerships with people outside of the group.

== In classical rabbinic interpretation ==
The parashah is discussed in these rabbinic sources from the era of the Mishnah and the Talmud:

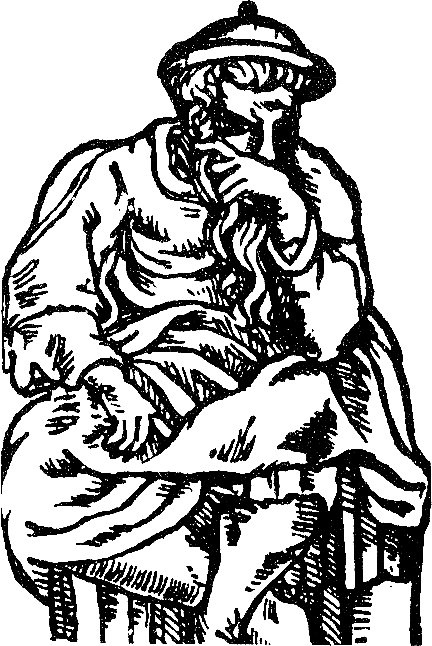
Rabbi Akiva (illustration from the 1568 Mantua Haggadah)

=== Exodus chapter 21 ===
Rabbi Akiva deduced from the words "now these are the ordinances that you shall put before them" in Exodus 21:1 that the teacher must wherever possible explain to the student the reasons behind the commandments.

Part of chapter 1 of Tractate Kiddushin in the Mishnah, Tosefta, Jerusalem Talmud, and Babylonian Talmud interpreted the laws of the Hebrew servant in Exodus 21:2–11 and 21:26–27; Leviticus 25:39–55; and Deuteronomy 15:12–18. The Mishnah taught that a Hebrew manservant (described in Exodus 21:2) was acquired by money or by contract, and could acquire his freedom by years of service, by the Jubilee year, or by deduction from the purchase price. The Mishnah taught that a Hebrew maidservant was more privileged in that she could acquire her freedom by signs of puberty. The servant whose ear was bored (as directed in Exodus 21:6) is acquired by boring his ear, and acquired his freedom by the Jubilee year or the master's death.

The Rabbis taught in a Baraita that the words of Deuteronomy 15:16 regarding the Hebrew servant, "he fares well with you," indicate that the Hebrew servant had to be "with"—that is, equal to—the master in food and drink. Thus, the master could not eat white bread and have the servant eat black bread. The master could not drink old wine and have the servant drink new wine. The master could not sleep on a feather bed and have the servant sleep on straw. Hence, they said that buying a Hebrew servant was like buying a master. Similarly, Rabbi Simeon deduced from the words of Leviticus 25:41, "Then he shall go out from you, he and his children with him," that the master was liable to provide for the servant's children until the servant went out. And Rabbi Simeon deduced from the words of Exodus 21:3, "If he is married, then his wife shall go out with him," that the master was responsible to provide for the servant's wife, as well.

Reading the words of Exodus 6:13, "And the Lord spoke to Moses and to Aaron, and gave them a command concerning the children of Israel," Rabbi Samuel bar Rabbi Isaac asked about what matter God commanded the Israelites. Rabbi Samuel bar Rabbi Isaac taught that God gave them the commandment about the freeing of slaves in Exodus 21:2–11.

The Gemara read Exodus 21:4 to address a Hebrew slave who married the Master's Canaanite slave. The Gemara thus deduced from Exodus 21:4 that the children of such a marriage were also considered Canaanite slaves and thus that their lineage flowed from their mother, not their father. The Gemara used this analysis of Exodus 21:4 to explain why the Mishnah taught that the son of a Canaanite slave mother does not impose the obligation of Levirite marriage (יִבּוּם, yibbum) under Deuteronomy 25:5–6. Further interpreting Exodus 21:4, the Gemara noted that the Canaanite slave woman nonetheless had an obligation to observe certain commandments.

Rabbi Eleazar reasoned that because Exodus 21:6 uses the term "ear" (in connection with the slave who refused to go out free) and Leviticus 14:14 also uses the term "ear" (in connection with the purification ritual for one with skin disease), just as Leviticus 14:14 explicitly requires using the right ear of the one to be cleansed, so Exodus 21:5 must also require using the slave's right ear.

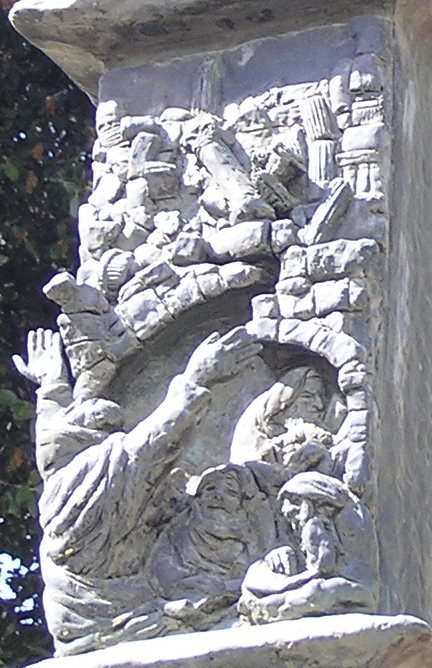
Joḥanan ben Zakai (detail from The Knesset Menorah in Jerusalem)

Reading Exodus 21:6, regarding the Hebrew servant who chose not to go free and whose master brought him to the doorpost and bore his ear through with an awl, Rabban Joḥanan ben Zakai explained that God singled out the ear from all the parts of the body because the servant had heard God's Voice on Mount Sinai proclaiming in Leviticus 25:55, "For to me the children of Israel are servants, they are my servants," and not servants of servants, and yet the servant acquired a master for himself when he might have been free. Rabbi Simeon bar Rabbi explained that God singled out the doorpost from all other parts of the house because the doorpost was witness in Egypt when God passed over the lintel and the doorposts (as reported in Exodus 12) and proclaimed (in the words of Leviticus 25:55), "For to me the children of Israel are servants, they are my servants," and not servants of servants, and so God brought them forth from bondage to freedom, yet this servant acquired a master for himself.

The Mishnah interpreted the language of Exodus 21:6 to teach that a man could sell his daughter, but a woman could not sell her daughter.

Rabbi Eliezer interpreted the conjugal duty of Exodus 21:10 to require relations: for men of independence, every day; for laborers, twice a week; for donkey-drivers, once a week; for camel-drivers, once in 30 days; for sailors, once in six months.

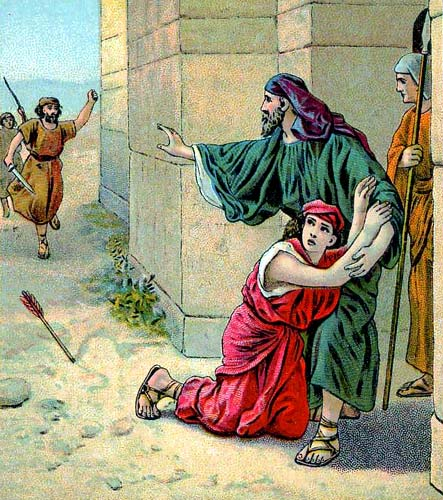
Cities of Refuge (illustration from a Bible card published 1901 by the Providence Lithograph Company)

Chapter 2 of tractate Makkot in the Mishnah, Tosefta, Jerusalem Talmud, and Babylonian Talmud interpreted the laws of the cities of refuge in Exodus 21:12–14, Numbers 35:1–34, Deuteronomy 4:41–43, and 19:1–13.

The Mishnah taught that those who killed in error went into banishment. One would go into banishment if, for example, while one was pushing a roller on a roof, the roller slipped over, fell, and killed someone. One would go into banishment if while one was lowering a cask, it fell down and killed someone. One would go into banishment if while coming down a ladder, one fell and killed someone. But one would not go into banishment if while pulling up the roller it fell back and killed someone, or while raising a bucket the rope snapped and the falling bucket killed someone, or while going up a ladder one fell down and killed someone. The Mishnah's general principle was that whenever the death occurred in the course of a downward movement, the culpable person went into banishment, but if the death did not occur in the course of a downward movement, the person did not go into banishment. If while chopping wood, the iron slipped from the ax handle and killed someone, Rabbi taught that the person did not go into banishment, but the sages said that the person did go into banishment. If from the split log rebounding killed someone, Rabbi said that the person went into banishment, but the sages said that the person did not go into banishment.

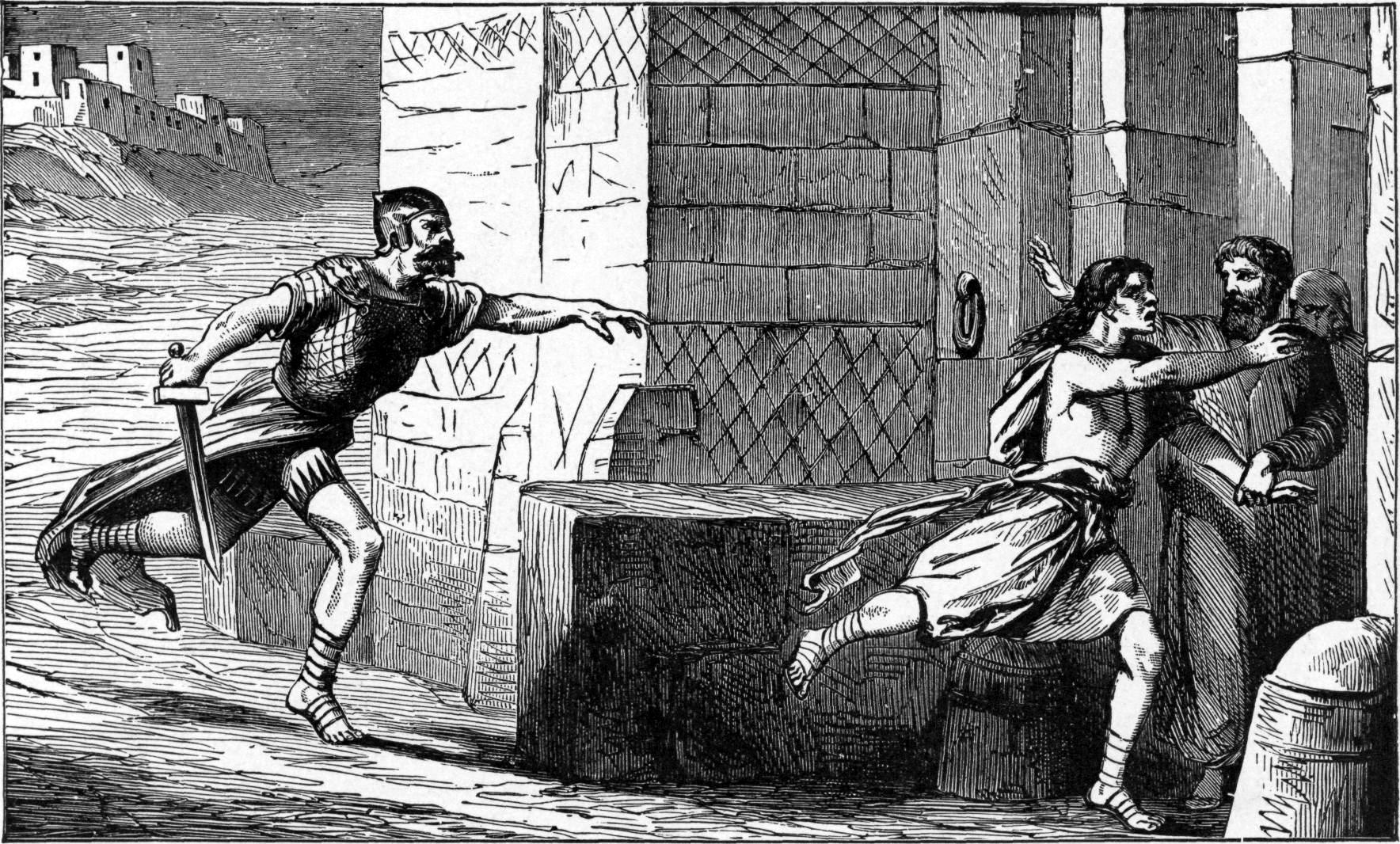
The City of Refuge (illustration from the 1897 Bible Pictures and What They Teach Us by Charles Foster)

Rabbi Jose bar Judah taught that to begin with, they sent a slayer to a city of refuge, whether the slayer killed intentionally or not. Then the court sent and brought the slayer back from the city of refuge. The Court executed whomever the court found guilty of a capital crime, and the court acquitted whomever the court found not guilty of a capital crime. The court restored to the city of refuge whomever the court found liable to banishment, as Numbers 35:25 ordained, "And the congregation shall restore him to the city of refuge from where he had fled." Numbers 35:25 also says, "The manslayer . . . shall dwell therein until the death of the high priest, who was anointed with the holy oil," but the Mishnah taught that the death of a high priest who had been anointed with the holy anointing oil, the death of a high priest who had been consecrated by the many vestments, or the death of a high priest who had retired from his office each equally made possible the return of the slayer. Rabbi Judah said that the death of a priest who had been anointed for war also permitted the return of the slayer. Because of these laws, mothers of high priests would provide food and clothing for the slayers in cities of refuge so that the slayers might not pray for the high priest's death. If the high priest died at the conclusion of the slayer's trial, the slayer did not go into banishment. If, however, the high priests died before the trial was concluded and another high priest was appointed in his stead and then the trial concluded, the slayer returned home after the new high priest's death.

Rabbi Akiva cited Exodus 21:14, in which the duty to punish an intentional murderer takes precedence over the sanctity of the altar, to support the proposition that the avoidance of danger to human life takes precedence over the laws of the Sabbath. Thus, if a murderer came as priest to do the Temple service, one could take him away from the precincts of the altar. And Rabbah bar bar Hana taught in the name of Rabbi Joḥanan that to save life—for example, if a priest could testify to the innocence of a defendant—one could take a priest down from the altar even while he was performing the Temple service. Now if this is so, even where doubt existed whether there was any substance to the priest's testimony, yet one interrupted the Temple service, and the Temple service was important enough to suspend the Sabbath, how much more should the saving of human life suspend the Sabbath laws.

Similarly, the Gemara reasoned that just as the Temple service—which was of high importance and superseded the Sabbath, as labor prohibited on the Sabbath could be performed in connection with the Temple service—could itself be superseded by the requirement to carry out a death sentence for murder, as Exodus 21:14 says, "You shall take him from My altar, that he may die," how much more reasonable is it that the Sabbath, which is superseded by the Temple service, should be superseded by the requirement to carry out a death sentence for murder?

Noting that Exodus 21:17 commands, "He that curses his father or his mother shall surely be put to death," and Leviticus 24:15 commands, "Whoever curses his God shall bear his sin," the Rabbis taught in a Baraita that Scripture likens cursing parents to cursing God. As Exodus 20:12 commands, "Honor your father and your mother," and Proverbs 3:9 directs, "Honor the Lord with your substance," Scripture likens the honor due to parents to that due to God. And as Leviticus 19:3 commands, "You shall fear your father and mother," and Deuteronomy 6:13 commands, "The Lord your God you shall fear and you shall serve," Scripture likens the fear of parents to the fear of God. But the Baraita conceded that with respect to striking (which Exodus 21:15 addresses with regard to parents), that it is certainly impossible (with respect to God). The Baraita concluded that these comparisons between parents and God are only logical, since the three (God, the mother, and the father) are partners in creation of the child. For the Rabbis taught in a Baraita that there are three partners in the creation of a person—God, the father, and the mother. When one honors one's father and mother, God considers it as if God had dwelt among them and they had honored God. And a Tanna taught before Rav Naḥman that when one vexes one's father and mother, God considers it right not to dwell among them, for had God dwelt among them, they would have vexed God.

Rav Aha taught that people have no power to bring about healing (and thus one should not practice medicine, but leave healing to God). But Abaye disagreed, as it was taught in the school of Rabbi Ishmael that the words of Exodus 21:19, "He shall cause him to be thoroughly healed," teach that the Torah gives permission for physicians to heal.

The Gemara taught that the words "eye for eye" in Exodus 21:24 meant pecuniary compensation. Rabbi Simon ben Yohai asked those who would take the words literally how they would enforce equal justice where a blind man put out the eye of another man, or an amputee cut off the hand of another, or where a lame person broke the leg of another. The school of Rabbi Ishmael cited the words "so shall it be given to him" in Leviticus 24:20, and deduced that the word "give" could apply only to pecuniary compensation. The school of Rabbi Ḥiyya cited the words "hand for hand" in the parallel discussion in Deuteronomy 19:21 to mean that an article was given from hand to hand, namely money. Abaye reported that a sage of the school of Hezekiah taught that Exodus 21:23–24 said "eye for eye" and "life for life," but not "life and eye for eye," and it could sometimes happen that eye and life would be taken for an eye, as when the offender died while being blinded. Rav Papa said in the name of Rava (Abba ben Joseph bar Ḥama) that Exodus 21:19 referred explicitly to healing, and the verse would not make sense if one assumed that retaliation was meant. And Rav Ashi taught that the principle of pecuniary compensation could be derived from the analogous use of the term "for" in Exodus 21:24 in the expression "eye for eye" and in Exodus 21:36 in the expression "he shall surely pay ox for ox." As the latter case plainly indicated pecuniary compensation, so must the former.

Tractate Bava Kamma in the Mishnah, Tosefta, Jerusalem Talmud, and Babylonian Talmud interpreted the laws of damages related to oxen in Exodus 21:28–32, 35–36, pits in Exodus 21:33–34, men who steal livestock in Exodus 21:37, crop-destroying beasts in Exodus 22:4, fires in Exodus 22:5, and related torts. The Mishnah taught that Scripture deals with four principal causes of damage: (1) the ox (in Exodus 21:35–36), (2) the pit (in Exodus 21:33–34), (3) the crop-destroying beast (in Exodus 22:4), and (4) the fire (in Exodus 22:5). The Mishnah taught that although they differed in some respects, they had in common that they are in the habit of doing damage, and they have to be under their owner's control so that whenever one of them does damage, the owner is liable to indemnify with the best of the owner's estate (when money is not tendered). The Rabbis taught in a Baraita that Scripture identifies three principal categories of damage by the ox: (1) by the horn (in Exodus 21:28), (2) by the tooth (in Exodus 22:4), and (3) by the foot (also in Exodus 22:4).

Noting that Exodus 21:37 provides a penalty of five oxen for the theft of an ox but only four sheep for the theft of a sheep, Rabbi Meir deduced that the law attaches great importance to labor. For in the case of an ox, a thief interferes with the beast's labor, while in the case of a sheep, a thief does not disturb it from labor. Rabban Joḥanan ben Zakai taught that the law attaches great importance to human dignity. For in the case of an ox, the thief can walk the animal away on its own feet, while in the case of a sheep, the thief usually has to carry it away, thus suffering indignity.

=== Exodus chapter 22 ===
Rabbi Ishmael cited Exodus 22:1, in which the right to defend one's home at night takes precedence over the prohibition of killing, to support the proposition that the avoidance of danger to human life takes precedence over the laws of the Sabbath. For in Exodus 22:1, despite all the other considerations, it is lawful to kill the thief. So even if in the case of the thief—where doubt exists whether the thief came to take money or life, and even though Numbers 35:34 teaches that the shedding of blood pollutes the land, so that the Divine Presence departs from Israel—yet it was lawful to save oneself at the cost of the thief's life, how much more may one suspend the laws of the Sabbath to save human life.

The Mishnah interpreted the language of Exodus 22:2 to teach that a man was sold to make restitution for his theft, but a woman was not sold for her theft.

Rabbi Ishmael and Rabbi Akiba differed over the meaning of the word "his" in the clause "of the best of his own field, and of the best of his own vineyard, shall he make restitution" in Exodus 22:4. Rabbi Ishmael read Exodus 22:4 to require the damager to compensate the injured party out of property equivalent to the injured party's best property, whereas Rabbi Akiba read Exodus 22:4 to require the damager to compensate the injured party out of the damager's best property. The Mishnah required that a damager compensates for damage done out of the damager's best quality property. The Gemara explained that the Mishnah imposed this high penalty because Exodus 22:4 requires it, and Exodus 22:4 imposes this penalty to discourage the doing of damage.

Rabbi Samuel bar Naḥmani in the name of Rabbi Joḥanan interpreted the account of spreading fire in Exodus 22:5 as an application of the general principle that calamity comes upon the world only when there are wicked persons (represented by the thorns) in the world, and its effects always manifest themselves first upon the righteous (represented by the grain).

Rabbi Isaac the smith interpreted Exodus 22:5 homiletically to teach that God has taken responsibility to rebuild the Temple, as God allowed the fire of man's sin to go out of Zion to destroy it, as Lamentations 4:11 reports, "He has kindled a fire in Zion, which has devoured the foundations thereof," and God will nonetheless rebuild them, as Zechariah 2:9 reports, "For I, says the Lord, will be to her a wall of fire round about, and I will be the glory in the midst of her."

Chapter 3 and portions of the chapters 7 and 8 of Tractate Bava Metzia in the Mishnah, Tosefta, Jerusalem Talmud, and Babylonian Talmud interpreted the laws of bailment in Exodus 22:6–14. The Mishnah identified four categories of guardians (shomrim): (1) an unpaid custodian (Exodus 22:6–8), (2) a borrower (Exodus 22:13–14a), (3) a paid custodian (Exodus 22:11), and (4) a renter (Exodus 22:14b). The Mishnah summarized the law when damage befell the property in question: An unpaid custodian must swear for everything and bears no liability, a borrower must pay in all cases, a paid custodian or a renter must swear concerning an animal that was injured, captured, or died, but must pay for loss or theft.

Rabbah explained that the Torah in Exodus 22:8–10 requires those who admit to a part of a claim against them to take an oath, because the law presumes that no debtor is so brazen in the face of a creditor as to deny the debt entirely.

Rabbi Haninah and Rabbi Joḥanan differed over whether sorcery like that in Exodus 22:17 had real power.

Rabbi Eliezer the Great taught that the Torah warns against wronging a stranger (גֵר, ger) in 36, or others say 46, places (including Exodus 22:20 and 23:9). A Baraita reported that Rabbi Nathan taught that one should not mention in another a defect that one has oneself. Thus, since the Jewish people were themselves strangers, they should not demean a convert because he is a stranger in their midst. And this explains the adage that one who has a person hanged in his family, does not say to another member of his household: Hang a fish for me, as the mention of hanging is demeaning for that family.

Citing Exodus 22:20 to apply to verbal wrongs, the Mishnah taught that one must not say to a repentant sinner, "remember your former deeds," and one must not taunt a child of converts saying, "remember the deeds of your ancestors." Similarly, a Baraita taught that one must not say to a convert who comes to study the Torah, "Shall the mouth that ate unclean and forbidden food, abominable and creeping things, come to study the Torah that was uttered by the mouth of Omnipotence!"

The Gemara taught that the Torah provided similar injunctions in Exodus 22:25 and Deuteronomy 24:12–13 to teach that a lender had to return a garment worn during the day before sunrise, and return a garment worn during the night before sunset.

Tractate Bekhorot in the Mishnah, Tosefta, and Talmud interpreted the laws of the firstborn in Exodus 13:1–2, 12–13; 22:28–29; and 34:19–20; and Numbers 3:13 and 8:17. Elsewhere, the Mishnah drew from 13:13 that money in exchange for a firstborn donkey could be given to any Kohen; that if a person weaves the hair of a firstborn donkey into a sack, the sack must be burned; that they did not redeem with the firstborn of a donkey an animal that falls within both wild and domestic categories (a koy); and that one was prohibited to derive benefit in any quantity at all from an unredeemed firstborn donkey. And elsewhere, the Mishnah taught that before the Israelites constructed the Tabernacle, the firstborns performed sacrificial services, but after the Israelites constructed the Tabernacle, the Priests (כֹּהֲנִים, Kohanim) performed the services.

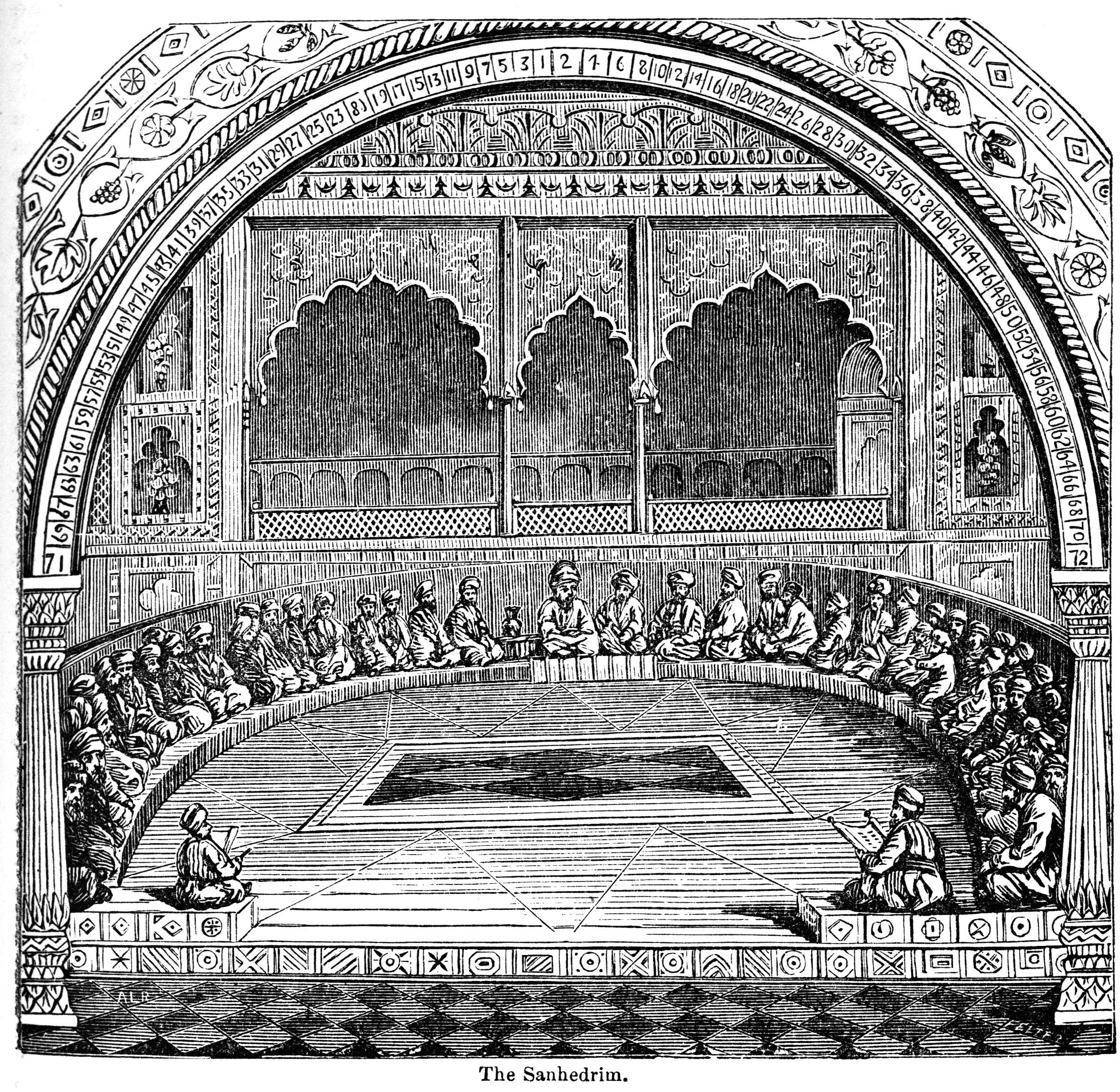
The Sanhedrin (illustration from the 1883 People's Cyclopedia of Universal Knowledge)

=== Exodus chapter 23 ===
In the Babylonian Talmud, the Gemara read Exodus 23:2, "You shall not follow a multitude to do evil," to support the rule that when a court tried a non-capital case, the decision of the majority of the judges determined the outcome.

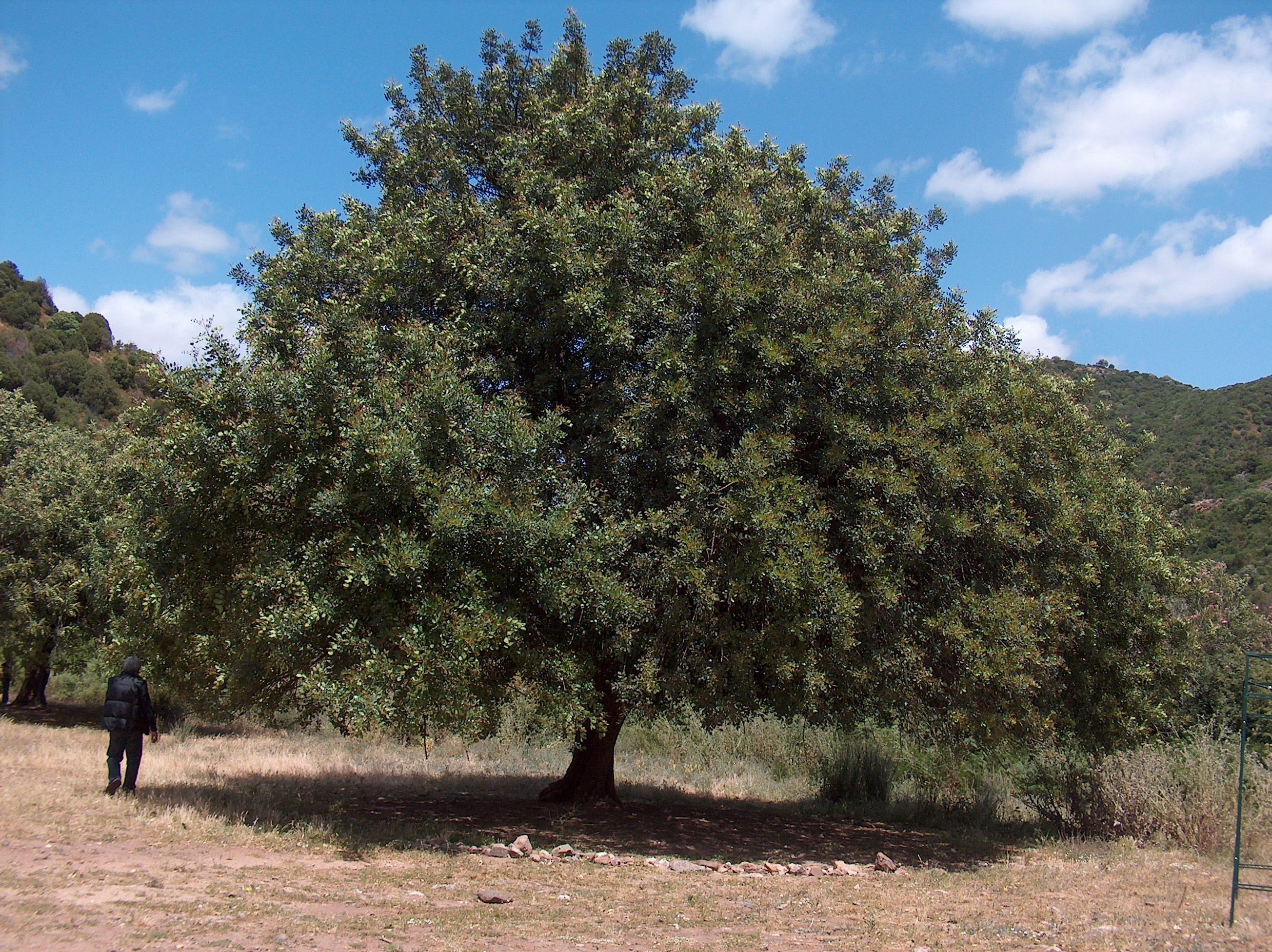
A carob tree

A Baraita taught that one day, Rabbi Eliezer employed every imaginable argument for the proposition that a particular type of oven was not susceptible to ritual impurity, but the Sages did not accept his arguments. Then Rabbi Eliezer told the Sages, "If the halachah agrees with me, then let this carob tree prove it," and the carob tree moved 100 cubits (and others say 400 cubits) out of its place. But the Sages said that no proof can be brought from a carob tree. Then Rabbi Eliezer told the Sages, "If the halachah agrees with me, let this stream of water prove it," and the stream of water flowed backwards. But the Sages said that no proof can be brought from a stream of water. Then Rabbi Eliezer told the Sages, "If the halachah agrees with me, let the walls of this house of study prove it," and the walls leaned over as if to fall. But Rabbi Joshua rebuked the walls, telling them not to interfere with scholars engaged in a halachic dispute. In honor of Rabbi Joshua, the walls did not fall, but in honor of Rabbi Eliezer, the walls did not stand upright, either. Then Rabbi Eliezer told the Sages, "If the halachah agrees with me, let Heaven prove it," and a Heavenly Voice cried out: "Why do you dispute with Rabbi Eliezer, for in all matters the halachah agrees with him!" But Rabbi Joshua rose and exclaimed in the words of Deuteronomy 30:12: "It is not in heaven." Rabbi Jeremiah explained that God had given the Torah at Mount Sinai; Jews pay no attention to Heavenly Voices, for God wrote in Exodus 23:2: "After the majority must one incline." Later, Rabbi Nathan met Elijah and asked him what God did when Rabbi Joshua rose in opposition to the Heavenly Voice. Elijah replied that God laughed with joy, saying, "My children have defeated Me, My children have defeated Me!"

Rav Aḥa bar Pappa cited Exodus 23:2, "Neither shall you answer in a cause (רִב, riv)," to support the rule of Mishnah Sanhedrin 4:2 that in capital cases, the judges began issuing their opinions from the side, where the least significant judges sat. The Sages interpreted Exodus 23:2 to read, "Neither shall you answer after the Master (רַב, rav), that is: Do not dispute the opinion of the greatest among the judges. Were the judges to begin issuing their opinions from the greatest to the least among the judges, and the greatest would find the accused guilty, no judge would acquit the accused. Thus to encourage the lesser judges to speak freely in capital cases, the Mishnah's rule had them speak first.

The Mishnah read the emphatic words of Exodus 23:5 and Deuteronomy 22:4 to teach that these verses required people to help lift a neighbor's animal even if they lifted it, it fell again, and again, even five times. If the owner sat down and said, "Since the commandment is on you, if you wish to unload, unload," one was not obligated, for Exodus 23:5 says "with him." But if the owner was aged or sick, one was obligated to lift even without the owner's help. But Rabbi Simeon said that Exodus 23:5 required the passer-by to load it too. Rabbi Jose the Galilean said that if the animal bore more than its proper burden, then the passer-by had no obligation towards the owner, because Exodus 23:5 says, "If you see the donkey of him who hates you lying under its burden," which means, a burden under which it can stand. The Gemara concluded that Exodus 23:5 and Deuteronomy 22:4 require people to prevent suffering to animals. And the Gemara argued that when the Mishnah exempts the passerby when the owner does not participate in unloading the burden, it means that the passerby is exempt from unloading the burden for free, but is obligated to do so for remuneration.

Rabbi Samuel bar Rav Isaac said that Rav said that one is permitted to hate another whom one sees committing a sin, as Exodus 23:5 states: "If you see the donkey of he who hates you lying under its load." But the Gemara asked whether one is permitted to hate one's fellow, as Leviticus 19:17 says, “You shall not hate your brother in your heart,” which prohibits hating one's fellow. The Gemara concluded that one is permitted to hate another for evil behavior one sees, whereas others who are unaware of these actions may not hate the other. Rav Naḥman bar Isaac said: Not only is this permitted, it is even a commandment to hate this other person, as Proverbs 8:13 states: "The fear of God is to hate evil."

Rav Aḥa bar Pappa read Exodus 23:6, "You shall not incline the judgment of your poor in his cause," to teach that a court could not convict one accused of a capital crime (the "poor" person to whom Rav Aḥa read the verse to refer) by just a simple one-vote majority. Rav Aḥa's thus read Exodus 23:6 to make it harder for a court to convict one accused of a capital crime.

The Mishnah interpreted Exodus 23:8 to teach that judges who accept bribes and change their judgments on account of the bribe will not die of old age before their eyes grow weak.

A Baraita reasoned that Exodus 23:8, "And you shall take no bribe," cannot teach merely that one should not acquit the guilty nor convict the innocent due to a bribe, for Deuteronomy 16:19 already says, "You shall not wrest judgment." Rather, Exodus 23:8 teaches that even if a bribe is given to ensure that a judge acquit the innocent and convict the guilty, Exodus 23:8 nevertheless says, "And you shall take no bribe." Thus it is prohibited for a judge to receive anything from litigants, even if there is no concern at all that justice will be perverted.

Rava taught that the reason for the prohibition against taking a bribe is that once a judge accepts a bribe from a party, the judge's thoughts draw closer to the party and the party becomes like the judge's own self, and one does not find fault with oneself. The Gemara noted that the term "bribe" (שֹּׁחַד, shochad) alludes to this idea, as it can be read as "as he is one" (shehu chad), that is, the judge is at one mind with the litigant. Rav Papa taught that judges should not judge cases involving those whom the judge loves (as the judge will not find any fault in them), nor involving those whom the judge hates (as the judge will not find any merit in them).

The Sages taught that it is not necessary to say that Exodus 23:8 precludes bribery by means of money, and even verbal bribery is also prohibited. The law that a bribe is not necessarily monetary was derived from the fact that Exodus 23:8 does not say: "And you shall take no profit." The Gemara illustrated this by telling how Samuel was once crossing a river on a ferry and a certain man gave him a hand to help him out of the ferryboat. Samuel asked him what he was doing in the place, and when the man told Samuel that he had a case to present before Samuel, Samuel told him that he was disqualified from presiding over the case, as the man did Samuel a favor, and although no money changed hands, a bond had been formed between them. Similarly, the Gemara told that Ameimar disqualified himself from presiding over the case of a person who removed a feather from Ameimar's head, and Mar Ukva disqualified himself from presiding over the case of a person who covered spittle that was lying before Mar Ukva.

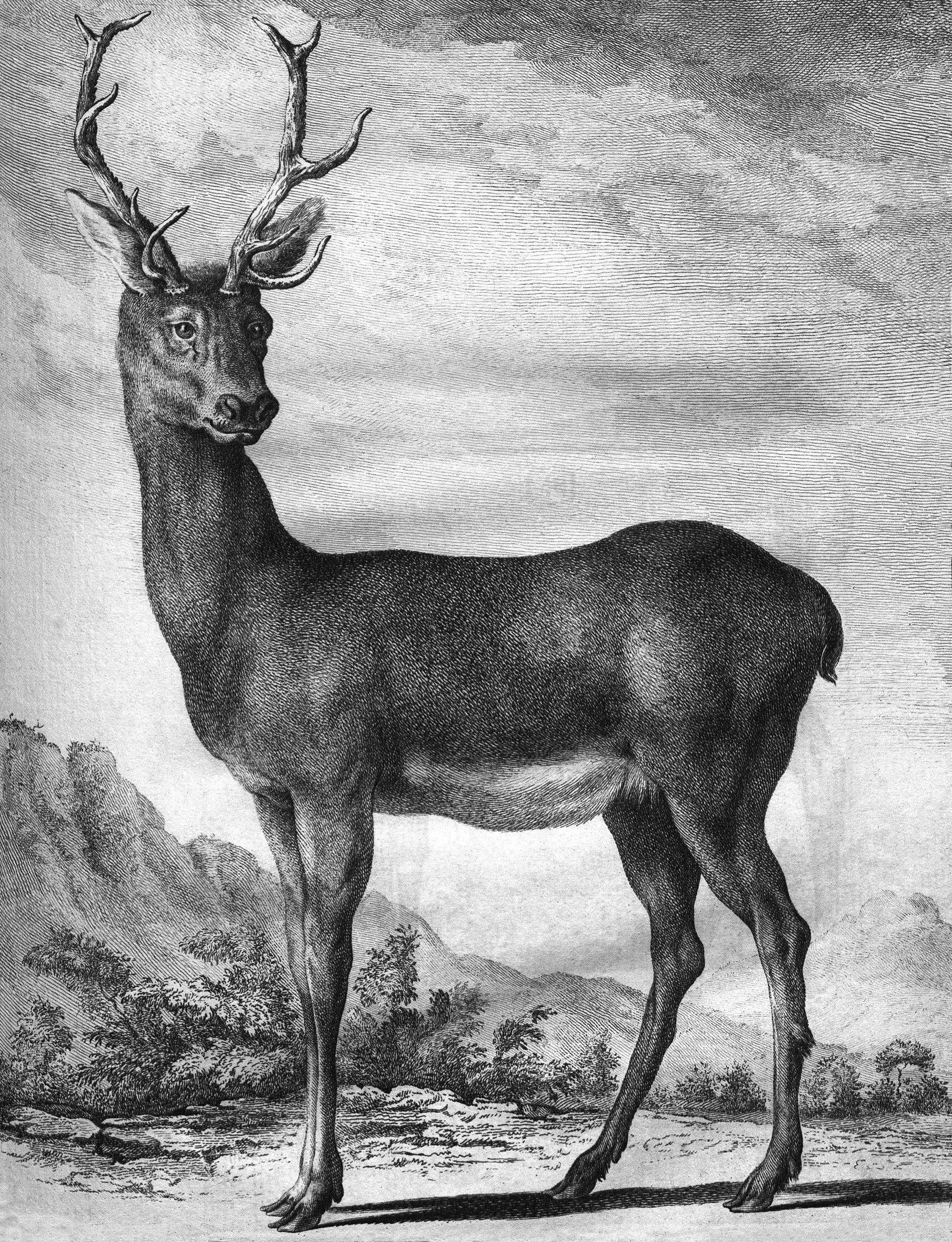
A Stag (from the 1756 Illustrations de Histoire naturelle générale et particulière avec la description du cabinet du roy)

A Midrash read Exodus 23:9 to says, "And a convert shall you not oppress," and read it together with Psalm 146:8–9, which the Midrash read as, "The Lord loves the righteous; the Lord preserves the converts." The Midrash taught that God loves those who love God, and thus God loves the righteous, because their worth is due neither to heritage nor to family. The Midrash compared God's great love of converts to a king who had a flock of goats, and once a stag came in with the flock. When the king was told that the stag had joined the flock, the king felt an affection for the stag and gave orders that the stag have good pasture and drink and that no one beat him. When the king's servants asked him why he protected the stag, the king explained that the flock have no choice, but the stag did. The king accounted it as a merit to the stag that had left behind the whole of the broad, vast wilderness, the abode of all the beasts, and had come to stay in the courtyard. In like manner, God provided converts with special protection, for God exhorted Israel not to harm them, as Deuteronomy 10:19 says, "Love therefore the convert," and Exodus 23:9 says, "And a convert shall you not oppress."

Tractate Sheviit in the Mishnah, Tosefta, and Jerusalem Talmud interpreted the laws of the Sabbatical year in Exodus 23:10–11, Leviticus 25:1–34, and Deuteronomy 15:1–18 and 31:10–13. The Mishnah asked until when a field with trees could be plowed in the sixth year. The House of Shammai said as long as such work would benefit fruit that would ripen in the sixth year. But the House of Hillel said until Shavuot. The Mishnah observed that in reality, the views of two schools approximate each other. The Mishnah taught that one could plow a grain-field in the sixth year until the moisture had dried up in the soil (that it, after Passover, when rains in the Land of Israel cease) or as long as people still plowed in order to plant cucumbers and gourds (which need a great deal of moisture). Rabbi Simeon objected that if that were the rule, then we would place the law in the hands of each person to decide. But the Mishnah concluded that the prescribed period in the case of a grain-field was until Passover, and in the case of a field with trees, until Shavuot. But Rabban Gamaliel and his court ordained that working the land was permitted until the New Year that began the seventh year. Rabbi Joḥanan said that Rabban Gamaliel and his court reached their conclusion on Biblical authority, noting the common use of the term "Sabbath" (שַׁבַּת, Shabbat) in both the description of the weekly Sabbath in Exodus 31:15 and the sabbatical year in Leviticus 25:4. Thus, just as in the case of the Sabbath Day, work is forbidden on the day itself, but allowed on the day before and the day after, so likewise in the Sabbath Year, tillage is forbidden during the year itself, but allowed in the year before and the year after.

The Mishnah taught that exile resulted from (among other things) transgressing the commandment (in Exodus 23:10–11 and Leviticus 25:3–5) to observe a Sabbatical year for the land. Rabbi Isaac taught that the words of Psalm 103:20, "mighty in strength that fulfill His word," speak of those who observe the Sabbatical year. Rabbi Isaac said that we often find that a person fulfills a precept for a day, a week, or a month, but it is remarkable to find one who does so for an entire year. Rabbi Isaac asked whether one could find a mightier person than one who sees his field untilled, see his vineyard untilled, and yet pays his taxes and does not complain. And Rabbi Isaac noted that Psalm 103:20 uses the words "that fulfill His word (דְּבָרוֹ, devaro)," and Deuteronomy 15:2 says regarding observance of the Sabbatical year, "And this is the manner (דְּבַר, devar) of the release," and argued that דְּבַר, devar means the observance of the Sabbatical year in both places.

Tractate Shabbat in the Mishnah, Tosefta, Jerusalem Talmud, and Babylonian Talmud interpreted the laws of the Sabbath in Exodus 16:23 and 29; 20:8–11; 23:12; 31:13–17; 35:2–3; Leviticus 19:3; 23:3; Numbers 15:32–36; and Deuteronomy 5:12.

A Midrash asked to which commandment Deuteronomy 11:22 refers when it says, "For if you shall diligently keep all this commandment that I command you, to do it, to love the Lord your God, to walk in all His ways, and to cleave to Him, then will the Lord drive out all these nations from before you, and you shall dispossess nations greater and mightier than yourselves." Rabbi Levi said that "this commandment" refers to the recitation of the Shema (Deuteronomy 6:4–9), but the Rabbis said that it refers to the Sabbath, which is equal to all the precepts of the Torah.

The Alphabet of Rabbi Akiva taught that when God was giving Israel the Torah, God told them that if they accepted the Torah and observed God's commandments, then God would give them for eternity a most precious thing that God possessed—the World To Come. When Israel asked to see in this world an example of the World To Come, God replied that the Sabbath is an example of the World To Come.

The Gemara deduced from the parallel use of the word "appear" in Exodus 23:14 and Deuteronomy 16:15 (regarding appearance offerings) on the one hand, and in Deuteronomy 31:10–12 (regarding the great assembly) on the other hand, that the criteria for who participated in the great assembly also applied to limit who needed to bring appearance offerings. A Baraita deduced from the words "that they may hear" in Deuteronomy 31:12 that a deaf person was not required to appear at the assembly. And the Baraita deduced from the words "that they may learn" in Deuteronomy 31:12 that a mute person was not required to appear at the assembly. But the Gemara questioned the conclusion that one who cannot talk cannot learn, recounting the story of two mute grandsons (or others say nephews) of Rabbi Joḥanan ben Gudgada who lived in Rabbi's neighborhood. Rabbi prayed for them, and they were healed. And it turned out that notwithstanding their speech impediment, they had learned halachah, Sifra, Sifre, and the whole Talmud. Mar Zutra and Rav Ashi read the words "that they may learn" in Deuteronomy 31:12 to mean "that they may teach," and thus to exclude people who could not speak from the obligation to appear at the assembly. Rabbi Tanhum deduced from the words "in their ears" (using the plural for "ears") at the end of Deuteronomy 31:11 that one who was deaf in one ear was exempt from appearing at the assembly.

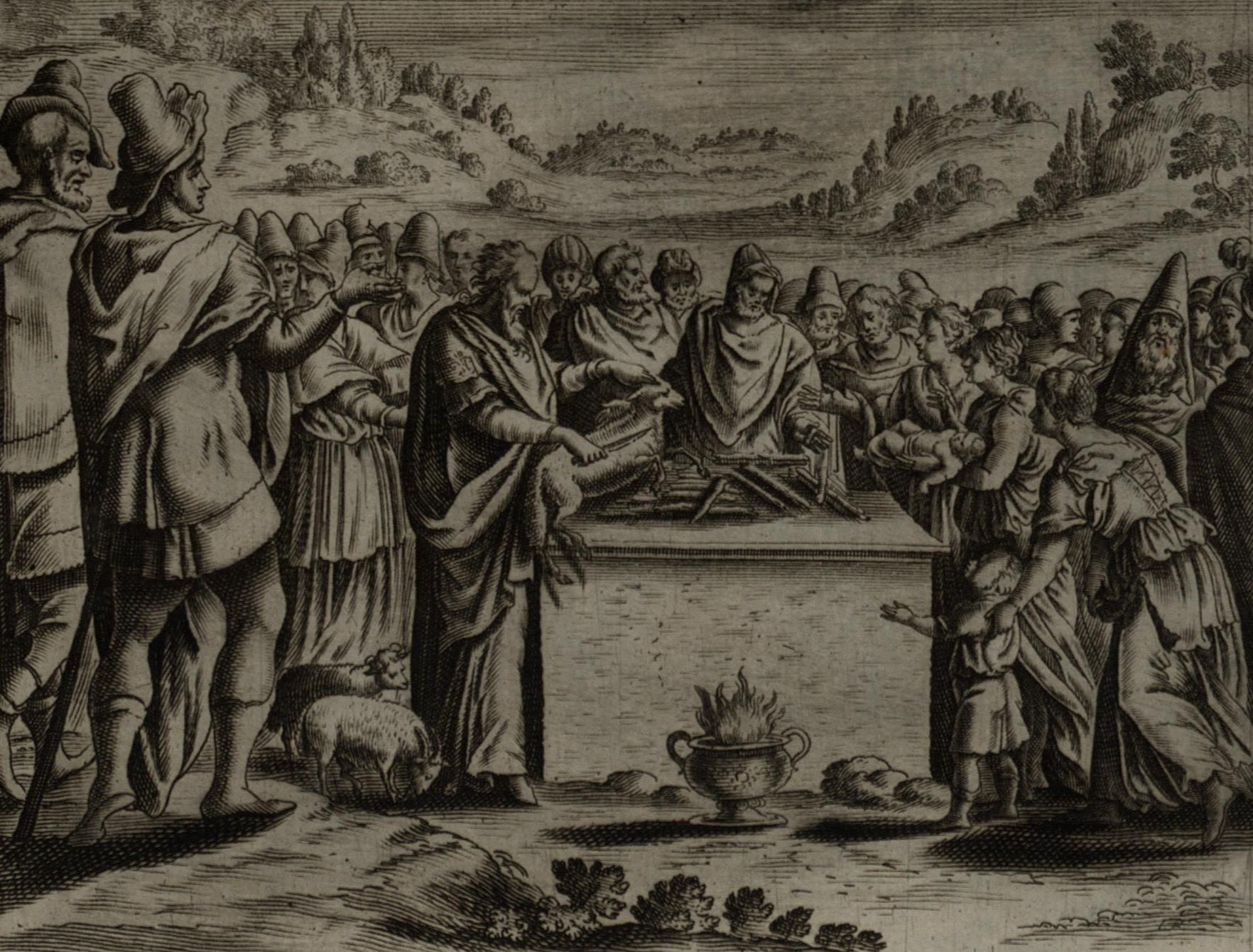
Passover (engraving by Gerard Jollain published 1670)

Tractate Beitzah in the Mishnah, Tosefta, Jerusalem Talmud, and Babylonian Talmud interpreted the laws common to all of the Festivals in Exodus 12:3–27, 43–49; 13:6–10; 23:16; 34:18–23; Leviticus 16; 23:4–43; Numbers 9:1–14; 28:16–30:1; and Deuteronomy 16:1–17; 31:10–13.

Tractate Pesachim in the Mishnah, Tosefta, Jerusalem Talmud, and Babylonian Talmud interpreted the laws of the Passover in Exodus 12:3–27, 43–49; 13:6–10; 23:15; 34:25; Leviticus 23:4–8; Numbers 9:1–14; 28:16–25; and Deuteronomy 16:1–8.

The Mishnah noted differences between the first Passover in Exodus 12:3–27, 43–49; 13:6–10; 23:15; 34:25; Leviticus 23:4–8; Numbers 9:1–14; 28:16–25; and Deuteronomy 16:1–8; and the second Passover in Numbers 9:9–13. The Mishnah taught that the prohibitions of Exodus 12:19 that "seven days shall there be no leaven found in your houses" and of Exodus 13:7 that "no leaven shall be seen in all your territory" applied to the first Passover; while at the second Passover, one could have both leavened and unleavened bread in one's house. And the Mishnah taught that for the first Passover, one was required to recite the Hallel (Psalms 113–118) when the Passover lamb was eaten; while the second Passover did not require the reciting of Hallel when the Passover lamb was eaten. But both the first and second Passovers required the reciting of Hallel when the Passover lambs were offered, and both Passover lambs were eaten roasted with unleavened bread and bitter herbs. And both the first and second Passovers took precedence over the Sabbath.

The Gemara noted that in listing the several Festivals in Exodus 23:15, Leviticus 23:5, Numbers 28:16, and Deuteronomy 16:1, the Torah always begins with Passover.

The Gemara cited Exodus 23:15 to support the proposition, which both Resh Lakish and Rabbi Joḥanan held, that on the mid-festival days (Chol HaMoed) it is forbidden to work. For the Rabbis taught in a Baraita the view of Rabbi Josiah that because the word "keep" is read to imply prohibition of work, the words, "The Feast of Unleavened Bread shall you keep, seven days," in Exodus 23:15 teach that work is forbidden for seven days, and thus work is forbidden on the mid-festival days.

According to one version of the dispute, Resh Lakish and Rabbi Joḥanan disagreed over how to interpret the words, "None shall appear before Me empty," in Exodus 23:15. Resh Lakish argued that Exodus 23:15 taught that whenever a pilgrim appeared at the Temple, even during the succeeding days of a multi-day Festival, the pilgrim had to bring an offering. But Rabbi Joḥanan argued that Exodus 23:15 refers to only the first day of a Festival, and not to succeeding days. After relating this dispute, the Gemara reconsidered and concluded that Resh Lakish and Rabbi Joḥanan differed not over whether additional offerings were obligatory, but over whether additional offerings were permitted.

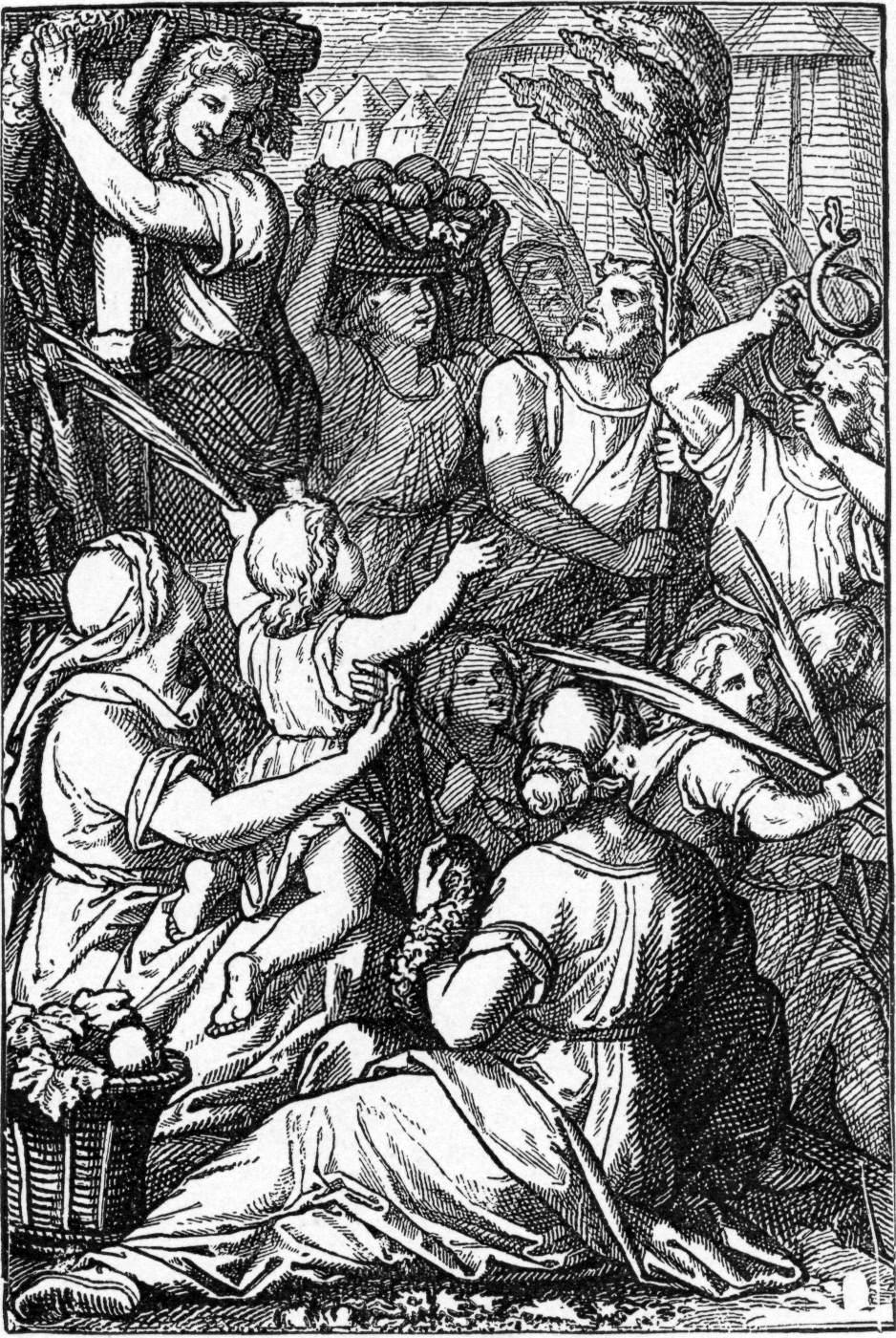
Carrying Branches To Make Booths (illustration from the 1897 Bible Pictures and What They Teach Us by Charles Foster)

Tractate Sukkah in the Mishnah, Tosefta, Jerusalem Talmud, and Babylonian Talmud interpreted the laws of Sukkot in Exodus 23:16; 34:22; Leviticus 23:33–43; Numbers 29:12–34; and Deuteronomy 16:13–17; 31:10–13.

The Mishnah taught that a sukkah can be no more than 20 cubits high. Rabbi Judah, however, declared taller sukkot valid. The Mishnah taught that a sukkah must be at least 10 handbreadths high, have three walls, and have more shade than sun. The House of Shammai declared invalid a sukkah made 30 days or more before the festival, but the House of Hillel pronounced it valid. The Mishnah taught that if one made the sukkah for the purpose of the festival, even at the beginning of the year, it is valid.

The Mishnah taught that a sukkah under a tree is as invalid as a sukkah within a house. If one sukkah is erected above another, the upper one is valid, but the lower is invalid. Rabbi Judah said that if there are no occupants in the upper one, then the lower one is valid.

It invalidates a sukkah to spread a sheet over the sukkah because of the sun, or beneath it because of falling leaves, or over the frame of a four-post bed. One may spread a sheet, however, over the frame of a two-post bed.

It is not valid to train a vine, gourd, or ivy to cover a sukkah and then cover it with sukkah covering (s'chach). If, however, the sukkah-covering exceeds the vine, gourd, or ivy in quantity, or if the vine, gourd, or ivy is detached, it is valid. The general rule is that one may not use for sukkah-covering anything that is susceptible to ritual impurity (tumah) or that does not grow from the soil. But one may use for sukkah-covering anything not susceptible to ritual impurity that grows from the soil.

Bundles of straw, wood, or brushwood may not serve as sukkah-covering. But any of them, if they are untied, are valid. All materials are valid for the walls.

Rabbi Judah taught that one may use planks for the sukkah-covering, but Rabbi Meir taught that one may not. The Mishnah taught that it is valid to place a plank four handbreadths wide over the sukkah, provided that one does not sleep under it.

The Mishnah deduced from the words "the feast of harvest, the firstfruits of your labors, which you sow in the field" in Exodus 23:16 that firstfruits were not to be brought before Shavuot. The Mishnah reported that the men of Mount Zeboim brought their firstfruits before Shavuot, but the priests did not accept them, because of what is written in Exodus 23:16.

Tractate Bikkurim in the Mishnah, Tosefta, and Jerusalem Talmud interpreted the laws of the firstfruits in Exodus 23:19, Numbers 18:13, and Deuteronomy 12:17–18 and 26:1–11. The Mishnah interpreted the words "the firstfruits of your land" in Exodus 23:19 to mean that a person could not bring firstfruits unless all the produce came from that person's land. The Mishnah thus taught that people who planted trees but bent their branches into or over another's property could not bring firstfruits from those trees. And for the same reason, the Mishnah taught that tenants, lessees, occupiers of confiscated property, or robbers could not bring firstfruits.

The Mishnah taught that they buried meat that had mixed with milk in violation of Exodus 23:19 and 34:26 and Deuteronomy 14:21.

Rav Naḥman taught that the angel of whom God spoke in Exodus 23:20 was Metatron (מטטרון). Rav Naḥman warned that one who is as skilled in refuting heretics as Rav Idit should do so, but others should not. Once a heretic asked Rav Idit why Exodus 24:1 says, "And to Moses He said, 'Come up to the Lord,'" when surely God should have said, "Come up to Me." Rav Idit replied that it was the angel Metatron who said that, and that Metatron's name is similar to that of his Master (and indeed the gematria (numerical value of the Hebrew letters) of Metatron (מטטרון) equals that of Shadai (שַׁדַּי), God's name in Genesis 17:1 and elsewhere) for Exodus 23:21 says, "for my name is in him." But if so, the heretic retorted, we should worship Metatron. Rav Idit replied that Exodus 23:21 also says, "Be not rebellious against him," by which God meant, "Do not exchange Me for him" (as the word for "rebel," (תַּמֵּר, tameir) derives from the same root as the word "exchange"). The heretic then asked why then Exodus 23:21 says, "he will not pardon your transgression." Rav Idit answered that indeed Metatron has no authority to forgive sins, and the Israelites would not accept him even as a messenger, for Exodus 33:15 reports that Moses told God, "If Your Presence does not go with me, do not carry us up from here."

The Midrash Tanhuma taught that the words "the place which I have prepared" in Exodus 23:20 indicate that the Temple in Jerusalem is directly opposite the Temple in Heaven.

The Gemara interpreted the words of Moses, "I am 120 years old this day," in Deuteronomy 31:2 to signify that Moses spoke on his birthday, and that he thus died on his birthday. Citing the words "the number of your days I will fulfill" in Exodus 23:26, the Gemara concluded that God completes the years of the righteous to the day, concluding their lives on their birthdays.

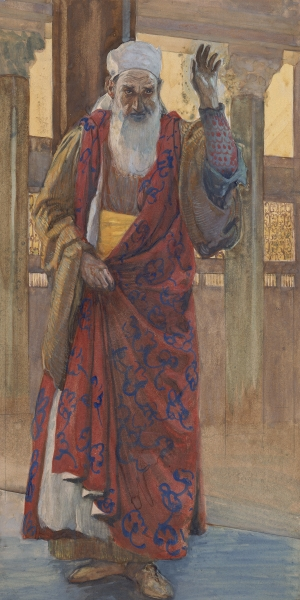
Isaiah (watercolor circa 1896–1902 by James Tissot)

The Gemara reported a dispute over the meaning of Exodus 23:26. Rava taught that King Manasseh of Judah tried and executed Isaiah, charging Isaiah with false prophesy based, among other things, on a contradiction between Exodus 23:26 and Isaiah's teachings. Manasseh argued that when (as reported in Exodus 23:26) Moses quoted God saying, "The number of your days I will fulfill," God meant that God would allow people to live out their appointed lifespan, but not add to it. But Manasseh noted that Isaiah told Manasseh's father Hezekiah (as reported in 2 Kings 20:5–6) that God promised Hezekiah, "I will add on to your days fifteen years." According to Rava, Isaiah did not dispute Manasseh's charges, knowing that Manasseh would not accept Isaiah's argument, no matter how truthful, and Manasseh had Isaiah killed. The Gemara reported that the Tannaim disagreed about the interpretation of the words "the number of your days I will fulfill" in Exodus 23:26. A Baraita taught that "the number of your days I will fulfill" refers to the lifespan that God allots to every human being at birth. Rabbi Akiba taught that if one is worthy, God allows one to complete the full period; if unworthy, God reduces the number of years. The Sages, however, taught that if one is worthy, God adds years to one's life; if one is unworthy, God reduces the years. The Sages argued to Rabbi Akiba that Isaiah's prophesy to Hezekiah in 2 Kings 20:5–6, "And I will add to your days fifteen years," supports the Sages' interpretation. Rabbi Akiba replied that God made the addition to Hezekiah's lifespan from years that God had originally intended for Hezekiah that Hezekiah had previously lost due to sin. Rabbi Akiba cited in support of his position the words of the prophet in the days of Jeroboam, before the birth of Hezekiah, who prophesied (as reported in 1 Kings 13:2), "a son shall be born to the house of David, Josiah by name." Rabbi Akiba argued that since the prophet prophesied the birth of Manasseh's son Josiah before the birth of Manasseh's father Hezekiah, it must be that at Hezekiah's birth God had allotted to Hezekiah enough years to extend beyond the time of Hezekiah's illness (when Isaiah prophesied in 2 Kings 20:5–6) so as to include the year of Manasseh's birth. Consequently, Rabbi Akiba argued, at the time of Hezekiah's illness, God must have reduced the original number of years allotted to Hezekiah, and upon Hezekiah's recovery, God must have added back only that which God had previously reduced. The Rabbis, however, argued back that the prophet in the days of Jeroboam who prophesied in 1 Kings 13:2 did not prophesy that Josiah would necessarily descend from Hezekiah. The prophet prophesied in 1 Kings 13:2 that Josiah would be born "to the house of David." Thus Josiah might have descended either from Hezekiah or from some other person in the Davidic line.

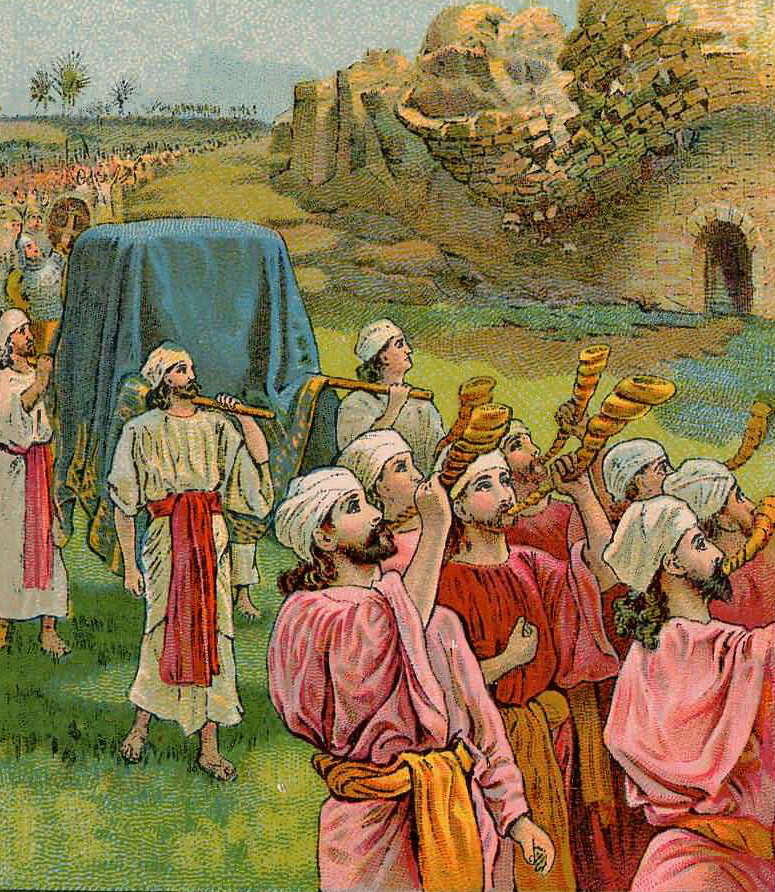
The Fall of Jericho (illustration from a Bible card published 1901 by the Providence Lithograph Company)

A Baraita taught that the words, "I will send My terror before you, and will discomfort all the people to whom you shall come, and I will make all your enemies turn their backs to you," in Exodus 23:27, and the words, "Terror and dread fall upon them," in Exodus 15:16 show that no creature was able to withstand the Israelites as they entered into the Promised Land in the days of Joshua, and those who stood against them were immediately panic-stricken and lost control of their bowels. And the words, "till Your people pass over, O Lord," in Exodus 15:16 allude to the first advance of the Israelites into the Promised Land in the days of Joshua. And the words, "till the people pass over whom You have gotten," in Exodus 15:16 allude to the second advance of the Israelites into the Promised Land in the days of Ezra. The Baraita thus concluded that the Israelites were worthy that God should perform a miracle on their behalf during the second advance as in the first advance, but that did not happen because the Israelites' sin caused God to withhold the miracle.

In Exodus 23:28, God promised to "send the hornet (צִּרְעָה, tzirah) before you, which shall drive out the Hivite, the Canaanite, and the Hittite, from before you," and in Deuteronomy 7:20, Moses promised that "the Lord your God will send the hornet (צִּרְעָה, tzirah) among them." But a Baraita taught that the hornet did not pass over the Jordan River with the Israelites. Rabbi Simeon ben Lakish reconciled the two sources, explaining that the hornet stood on the eastern bank of the Jordan and shot its venom over the river at the Canaanites. The venom blinded the Canaanites' eyes above and castrated them below, as Amos 2:9 says, "Yet destroyed I the Amorite before them, whose height was like the height of the cedars, and he was strong as the oaks; yet I destroyed his fruit from above and his roots from beneath." Rav Papa offered an alternative explanation, saying that there were two hornets, one in the time of Moses and the other in the time of Joshua. The former did not pass over the Jordan, but the latter did.

=== Exodus chapter 24 ===
Rav Huna son of Rav Kattina sat before Rav Ḥisda, and Rav Ḥisda cited Exodus 24:5, "And he sent the young men of the children of Israel, who offered burnt-offerings, and sacrificed peace-offerings of oxen to the Lord," as an application of the proposition stated in the Mishnah that "before the Tabernacle was set up . . . the service was performed by the firstborn; after the tabernacle was set up . . . the service was performed by priests." (The "young men" in Exodus 24:5 were the firstborn, not priests.) Rav Huna replied to Rav Ḥisda that Rabbi Assi taught that after that the firstborn ceased performing the sacrificial service (even though it was nearly a year before the Tabernacle was set up).

It was taught in a Baraita that King Ptolemy brought together 72 elders and placed them in 72 separate rooms, without telling them why he had brought them together, and asked each of them to translate the Torah. God then prompted each of them to conceive the same idea and write a number of cases in which the translation did not follow the Masoretic Text, including, for Exodus 24:5, "And he sent the elect of the children of Israel"—writing "elect" instead of "young men"; and for Exodus 24:11, "And against the elect of the children of Israel he put not forth his hand"—writing "elect" instead of "nobles."

Rabbi Isaac taught that when a king administers an oath to his legions, he does so with a sword, implying that whoever transgressed the oath would have the sword pass over his neck. Similarly, at Sinai, as Exodus 24:6 reports, "Moses took half of the blood" (thus adjuring them with the blood). The Midrash asked how Moses knew how much was half of the blood. Rabbi Judah bar Ila'i taught that the blood divided itself into halves on its own. Rabbi Nathan said that its appearance changed; half of it turned black, and half remained red. Bar Kappara told that an angel in the likeness of Moses came down and divided it. Rabbi Isaac taught that a Heavenly Voice came from Mount Horeb, saying that this much is half of the blood. Rabbi Ishmael taught in a Baraita that Moses was expert in the regulations relating to blood, and by means of that knowledge divided it. Exodus 24:6 goes on to say, "And he put it in basins (אַגָּנֹת, aganot)." Rav Huna said in the name of Rabbi Avin that Exodus 24:6 writes the word in a form that might be read aganat ("basin," singular) indicating that neither basin was larger than the other. Moses asked God what to do with God's portion. God told Moses to sprinkle it on the people. (Exodus 24:8 reports, "And Moses took the blood, and sprinkled it on the people.") Moses asked what he should do with the Israelites' portion. God said to sprinkle it on the altar, as Exodus 24:6 says, "And half of the blood he dashed against the altar."

Reading Exodus 24:7 "And he took the book of the covenant, and read in the hearing of the people," the Mekhilta asked what Moses had read. Rabbi Jose the son of Rabbi Judah said that Moses read from the beginning of Genesis up to Exodus 24:7. Rabbi said that Moses read to them the laws commanded to Adam, the commandments given to the Israelites in Egypt and at Marah, and all other commandments that they had already been given. Rabbi Ishmael said that Moses read to them the laws of the sabbatical years and the jubilees [in Leviticus 25] and the blessings and the curses in Leviticus 26, as it says at the end of that section (in Leviticus 26:46), "These are the statutes and ordinances and laws." The Israelites said that they accepted all those.

Reading the words of Exodus 24:7, "will we do, and hear" the Pirke De-Rabbi Eliezer taught that God asked the Israelites whether they would receive for themselves the Torah. Even before they had heard the Torah, they answered God that they would keep and observe all the precepts that are in the Torah, as Exodus 24:7 reports, "And they said, 'All that the Lord has spoken will we do, and be obedient.'"

Rabbi Phineas taught that it was on the eve of the Sabbath that the Israelites stood at Mount Sinai, arranged with the men apart and the women apart. God told Moses to ask the women whether they wished to receive the Torah. Moses asked the women first, because the way of men is to follow the opinion of women, as Exodus 19:3 reflects when it says, "Thus shall you say to the house of Jacob"—these are the women—and only thereafter does Exodus 19:3 say, "And tell the children of Israel"—these are the men. They all replied as with one voice, in the words of Exodus 24:7, "All that the Lord has spoken we will do, and be obedient."

Reading the words of Exodus 24:7, "will we do, and hear" Rabbi Simlai taught that when the Israelites gave precedence to "we will do" over "we will hear" (promising to obey God's commands even before hearing them), 600,000 ministering angels came and set two crowns on each Israelite man, one as a reward for "we will do" and the other as a reward for "we will hear." But as soon as the Israelites committed the sin of the Golden Calf, 1.2 million destroying angels descended and removed the crowns, as it is said in Exodus 33:6, "And the children of Israel stripped themselves of their ornaments from mount Horeb."

Rabbi Eleazar taught that when the Israelites gave precedence to "we will do" over "we will hear," a Heavenly Voice called out that this was a secret employed by the Ministering Angels, as Psalm 103:20 says, "Bless the Lord, you angels of His. You mighty in strength, who fulfill His word, who hear the voice of His word"—first they fulfill, then they hear.

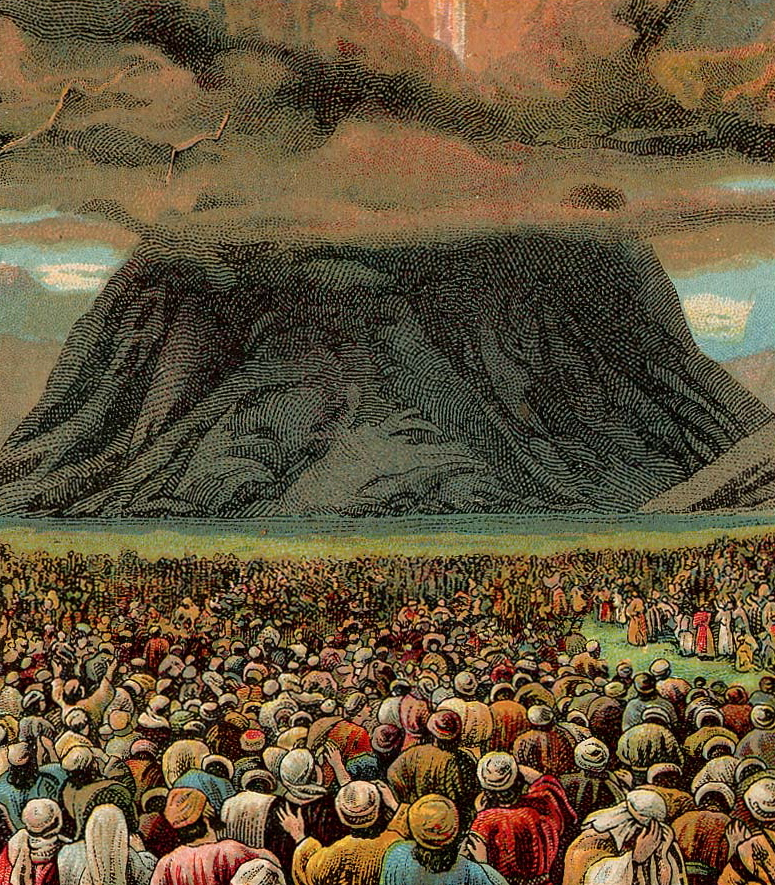
The Presence of the Lord Appeared as a Fire on the Top of the Mountain (illustration from a Bible card published 1907 by the Providence Lithograph Company)

Rabbi Hama son of Rabbi Haninah taught that Song of Songs 2:3 compared the Israelites to an apple tree with the words, "As the apple tree among the trees of the wood, so is my beloved among the sons." Rabbi Hama explained that this teaches that just as the fruit of the apple tree precedes its leaves, so did the Israelites give precedence to "we will do" over "we will hear."

When a certain Sadducee saw Rava so engrossed in his studies with his fingers under his feet that Rava ground his fingers so that they bled, the Sadducee exclaimed that Jews were a rash people who in Exodus 24:7 had given precedence to their mouth over their ears, and who persist in their rashness. First, the Sadducee explained, the Israelites should have listened, and then they should have accepted the law only if obeying the commandments was within their powers, but if it was not within their powers, they should not have accepted. Rava replied that the Israelites walked in integrity, for Proverbs 11:3 speaks of the Jews when it says, "The integrity of the upright shall guide them." But of others, who walked in perversity, Proverbs 11:3 says, "but the perverseness of the treacherous shall destroy them."

Rabbi Azariah in the name of Rabbi Judah ben Rabbi Simon taught that once the Israelites said (as reported in Exodus 24:7), "All that the Lord has spoken will we do, and obey," they left the infancy of Israel's nationhood. Rabbi Azariah in the name of Rabbi Judah ben Rabbi Simon explained in a parable. A mortal king had a daughter whom he loved exceedingly. So long as his daughter was small, he would speak with her in public or in the courtyard. When she grew up and reached puberty, the king determined that it no longer befit his daughter's dignity for him to converse with her in public. So he directed that a pavilion be made for her so that he could speak with his daughter inside the pavilion. In the same way, when God saw the Israelites in Egypt, they were in the childhood of their nationhood, as Hosea 11:1 says, "When Israel was a child, then I loved him, and out of Egypt I called My son." When God saw the Israelites at Sinai, God spoke with them as Deuteronomy 5:4 says, "The Lord spoke with you face to face." As soon as they received the Torah, became God's nation, and said (as reported in Exodus 24:7), "All that the Lord has spoken will we do, and obey," God observed that it was no longer in keeping with the dignity of God's children that God should converse with them in the open. So God instructed the Israelites to make a Tabernacle, and when God needed to communicate with the Israelites, God did so from the Tabernacle. And thus Numbers 7:89 bears this out when it says, "And when Moses went into the tent of meeting that He might speak with him."

Rabbi Berekiah and Rabbi Jeremiah the son of Rabbi Ḥiyya bar Abba said that Rabbi Levi ben Sisi gave the following exposition at Nehardea: Exodus 24:10 says, "And they saw the God of Israel; and there was under His feet the like of a brick-work of sapphire stone." This was the case before they had been redeemed (from Egyptian bondage), but when they had been redeemed the brickwork was placed where the brick was generally kept (and cast away). (Before they were redeemed God had brick-work underfoot, symbolizing the bricks to which the Israelites were enslaved, for in all Israel's troubles, God suffers too. But after their redemption, the brick-work was replaced with heaven in its purity.) Rabbi Berekiah taught that it is not written in the present context, "A brick-work of sapphire," but "The like of a brick-work of sapphire," implying that both it (the Torah, symbolized by the brick) and all the implements appertaining to it were given, including the basket and the trowel appertaining to it (symbolizing the Oral Law) were given. (The expression "like" serves to include the object compared as well as everything resembling or connected with it.) Bar Kappara said that before the Israelites were redeemed from Egypt, the brick-work under God's feet was placed as a mark in heaven, but when the Israelites were redeemed, it was seen no more in heaven. For Exodus 24:10 says, "And the like of the very heaven for clearness," implying the sky on a clear day.

The Gemara used the account of Exodus 24:10 to help explain the blue in the fringes (ציצית, tzitzit) of the prayer shawl (טַלִּית, tallit). It was taught in a Baraita that Rabbi Meir used to ask why Numbers 15:38 specified blue from among all the colors for the fringes. Rabbi Meir taught that it was because blue resembles the color of the sea, and the sea resembles the color of the sky, and the sky resembles the color of the Throne of Glory, as Exodus 24:10 says, "And there was under His feet as it were a paved work of sapphire stone," and Ezekiel 1:26 says, "The likeness of a throne as the appearance of a sapphire stone." (And thus, when one sees the blue thread of the fringe, it will help call to mind God.) And it was taught in a Baraita that Rabbi Meir used to say that the punishment for failing to observe the white threads of the fringes is greater than for failing to observe the blue threads. The Gemara illustrated this by a parable: A king gave orders to two servants. He asked one servant to bring a seal of clay, and he asked other to bring a seal of gold. And they both failed in their tasks. The Gemara argued that the servant deserving the greater punishment was the one whom the king directed to bring a seal of clay. (For clay is easier to get than gold. Thus the punishment for failing to get the simple white fringe should be greater than the penalty for failing to get the rare blue thread.)

A Midrash taught that when Nadab, Abihu, and the 70 elders ate and drank in God's Presence in Exodus 24:11, they sealed their death warrant. The Midrash asked why in Numbers 11:16, God directed Moses to gather 70 elders of Israel, when Exodus 29:9 reported that there already were 70 elders of Israel. The Midrash deduced that when in Numbers 11:1, the people murmured, speaking evil, and God sent fire to devour part of the camp, all those earlier 70 elders had been burned up. The Midrash continued that the earlier 70 elders were consumed like Nadab and Abihu, because they too acted frivolously when (as reported in Exodus 24:11) they beheld God and inappropriately ate and drank. The Midrash taught that Nadab, Abihu, and the 70 elders deserved to die then, but because God so loved giving the Torah, God did not wish to create disturb that time.

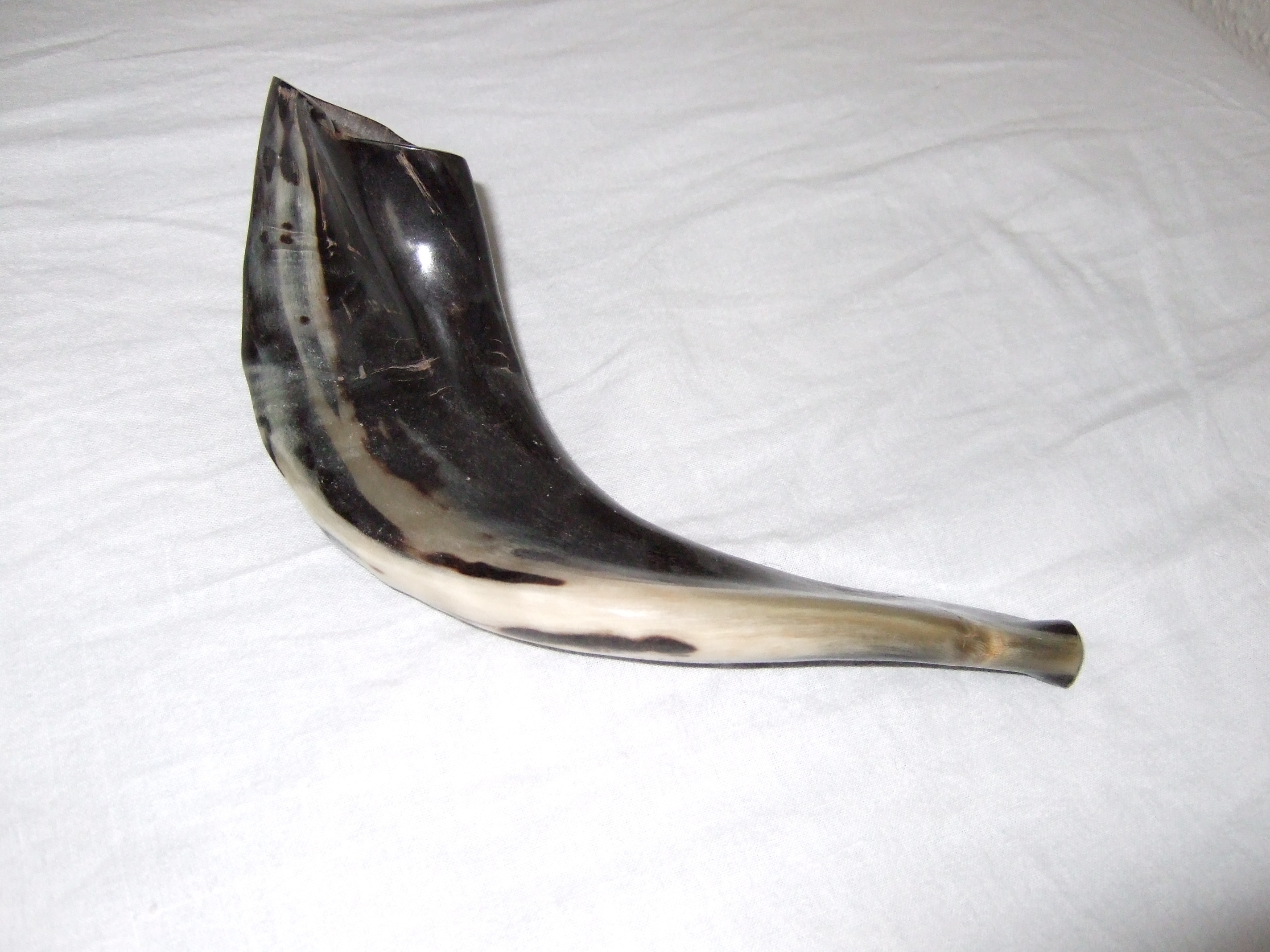
A Shofar

Rabbi Joshua son of Korchah taught that Moses stayed on Mount Sinai 40 days and 40 nights, reading the Written Law by day, and studying the Oral Law by night. After those 40 days, on the 17th of Tammuz, Moses took the Tablets of the Law, descended into the camp, broke the Tablets in pieces, and killed the Israelite sinners. Moses then spent 40 days in the camp, until he had burned the Golden Calf, ground it into powder like the dust of the earth, destroyed the idol worship from among the Israelites, and put every tribe in its place. And on the New Moon (ראש חודש, Rosh Chodesh) of Elul (the month before Rosh Hashanah), God told Moses in Exodus 24:12: "Come up to Me on the mount," and let them sound the shofar throughout the camp, for, behold, Moses has ascended the mount, so that they do not go astray again after the worship of idols. God was exalted with that shofar, as Psalm 47:5 says, "God is exalted with a shout, the Lord with the sound of a trumpet." Therefore, the Sages instituted that the shofar should be sounded on the New Moon of Elul every year.

The Rabbis noted that Exodus 24:14 mentions that Moses appointed Aaron's nephew Hur to share the leadership of the people with Aaron, but after Moses descended from Mount Sinai, Hur's name does not appear again. Rabbi Benjamin bar Japhet, reporting Rabbi Eleazar, interpreted the words of Exodus 32:5, "And when Aaron saw it, he built an altar before it," to mean that Aaron saw Hur lying slain before him and thought that if he did not obey the people, they would kill him as well. Aaron thought that the people would then fulfill the words of Lamentations 2:20, "Shall the Priest and the Prophet be slain in the Sanctuary of God?" and the people would then never find forgiveness. Aaron though it better to let the people worship the Golden Calf, for which they might yet find forgiveness through repentance. Thus, Rabbi Tanhum bar Hanilai taught that Aaron made the Golden Calf in Exodus 32:4 as a compromise with the people's demand in Exodus 32:1 to "make us a god who shall go before us." And thus Rabbi Tanhum bar Hanilai concluded that it was in reference to Aaron's decision-making in this incident that Psalm 10:3 can be read to mean, "He who praises one who makes a compromise blasphemes God."

Rabbi Zerika asked about an apparent contradiction of Scriptural passages in the presence of Rabbi Eleazar, or, according to another version, he asked in the name of Rabbi Eleazar. Exodus 24:18 says: "And Moses entered into the midst of the cloud," whereas Exodus 40:35 reads: "And Moses was not able to enter into the tent of meeting because the cloud abode thereon." The Gemara concluded that this teaches us that God took hold of Moses and brought him into the cloud. Alternatively, the school of Rabbi Ishmael taught in a Baraita that in Exodus 24:18, the word for "in the midst" (בְּתוֹךְ, be-tokh) appears, and it also appears in Exodus 14:22: "And the children of Israel went into the midst of the sea." Just as in Exodus 14:22, the word "in the midst" (בְּתוֹךְ, be-tokh) implies a path, as Exodus 14:22 says, "And the waters were a wall unto them," so here too in Exodus 24:18, there was a path (for Moses through the cloud).

Rabbi Simeon ben Yohai taught that because the generation of the Flood transgressed the Torah that God gave humanity after Moses had stayed on the mountain for 40 days and 40 nights (as reported in Exodus 24:18 and 34:28 and Deuteronomy 9:9–11, 18, 25, and 10:10), God announced in Genesis 7:4 that God would "cause it to rain upon the earth 40 days and 40 nights."

== In medieval Jewish interpretation ==
The parashah is discussed in these medieval Jewish sources:

=== Exodus chapter 21 ===
In the Torah's teaching (in Exodus 21:12–14, Numbers 35:10–29, and Deuteronomy 4:41–42 and 19:1–13) that one who killed another unintentionally did not incur capital punishment, Baḥya ibn Paquda found proof that an essential condition of liability for punishment is the association of mind and body in a forbidden act—that liability requires both intention and action.

Baḥya ibn Paquda taught that regarding health and sickness, people have a duty to trust in God, while working to maintain their health according to the means whose nature promotes this, and to fight sickness according to the customary ways, as God commanded in Exodus 21:19, "and he shall surely heal him." All of this, without trusting that the causes of health or illness will help or hurt without God's permission.

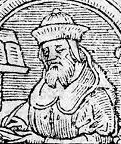
Rashi

=== Exodus chapter 23 ===
After reviewing the Babylonian Talmud's interpretations of Exodus 23:2 "You shall not follow a multitude to do evil," Rashi disagreed with those readings and argued that one should interpret the verse according to its context to mean that if one sees wicked people perverting justice, one should not follow them just to go with the crowd.

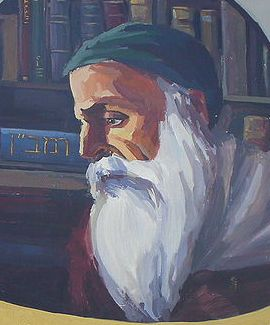
Naḥmanides

Naḥmanides noted that Exodus 23:4 states "your enemy's" and Exodus 23:5 says "of him who hates you," while the parallel commandment in Deuteronomy 22:2 says "your brother's." Naḥmanides taught that Scripture thus means to say, "Do this for him (in assisting him), and remember the brotherhood between you and forget the hatred."

Similarly, Baḥya ben Asher noted the parallel between Exodus 23:5 and Deuteronomy 22:1–3. Baḥya concluded that Scripture thus promises that "if you assist your enemy with his falling donkey, he will eventually appreciate you and become 'your brother.' When you assist him, he will forget the 'hatred' between you and only remember the bond of love that unites brothers."

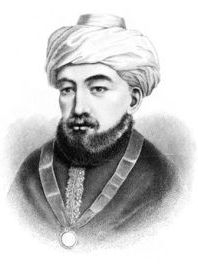
Maimonides

Maimonides read Exodus 23:5, "If you see the ass of him that hates you lying under its burden, you shall forbear to pass by him; you shall surely release it with him," together with Deuteronomy 22:4, "You shall not see your brother's ass or his ox fallen down by the way, and hide yourself from them; you shall surely help him to lift them up again." Maimonides taught that when a person encounters a colleague on a journey and the colleague's animal has fallen under its load, Exodus 23:5 commands the person to unload the burden from it, whether or not the animal was carrying an appropriate burden for it. Maimonides interpreted Deuteronomy 22:4 to command that one should not unload the animal and depart, leaving the wayfarer in panic, but one should lift up the animal together with its owner, and reload the animal's burden on it. Maimonides taught that the general principle is that if the animal were one's own and one would unload and reload it, one is obligated to unload and reload it for a colleague. If one is pious and goes beyond the measure of the law, even if one is a great prince, and sees an animal belonging to a colleague fallen under a load of straw, reeds or the like, one should unload and load it with its owner. Maimonides interpreted the intensified form of the verbs in Exodus 23:5 and Deuteronomy 22:4 to indicate that if one unloaded and reloaded the animal, and it fell again, one is obligated to unload and reload it another time, indeed even 100 times. Thus, one must accompany the animal for a distance thereafter, unless the owner of the burden says that it is not necessary. Maimonides read Exodus 23:5 to obligate one when one sees the fallen animal in a way that can be described as an encounter, for Exodus 23:5 says, "When you see your colleague's donkey," and Exodus 23:4 says, "When you encounter . . . ." Maimonides taught that if one finds an animal belonging to a colleague fallen under its load, it is a commandment to unload and reload it even if its owner is not present, for the words "You shall certainly help" and "You shall certainly lift up" imply that one must fulfill these commandments in all situations. Maimonides said that Exodus 23:5 says "together with him" (that is, the animal's owner) to teach that if the owner of the animal was there and goes off to the side and relies on the passerby to unload it alone because the passerby is subject to a commandment, then the passerby is not obligated. If the owner of the animal is old or ailing, however, the passerby is obligated to load and unload the animal alone.

Baḥya ibn Paquda cited Exodus 23:25 for the proposition that the relation of nature to the Torah is that of a servant to a master, and the forces of nature operate in harmony with the teaching of the Torah.

Maimonides cited Exodus 23:25 to support the proposition that it is a positive Torah commandment to pray every day, for Exodus 23:25 states: "You shall serve God, your Lord," and tradition teaches that this service is prayer, as Deuteronomy 11:13 says, "And serve Him with all your heart," and our Sages said that the service of the heart is prayer.

=== Exodus chapter 24 ===
Baḥya ibn Paquda interpreted the word "hear" in Exodus 24:7, "we will do and we will hear," not to mean hearing of the ear, but belief and acceptance of the heart, as in Deuteronomy 6:3, "Hear therefore, O Israel, and observe to do it."

Baḥya ibn Paquda noted that Exodus 24:10, "under His feet," implies that God has physical form and body parts. Baḥya explained that necessity brought people to anthropomorphize God and describe God in terms of human attributes so that human listeners could grasp God in their minds. After doing so, people can learn that such description was only metaphorical, and that the truth is too fine, too sublime, too exalted, and too remote from the ability and powers of human minds to grasp. Baḥya advised wise thinkers to endeavor to remove the husk of the terms and their corporeality and ascend in their minds step by step to reach the true intended meaning according to the power and ability of their minds to grasp.

== In modern interpretation ==
The parashah is discussed in these modern sources:

=== Exodus chapter 21 ===
Jacob Milgrom identified Exodus 21–23 as the Torah's oldest law code.

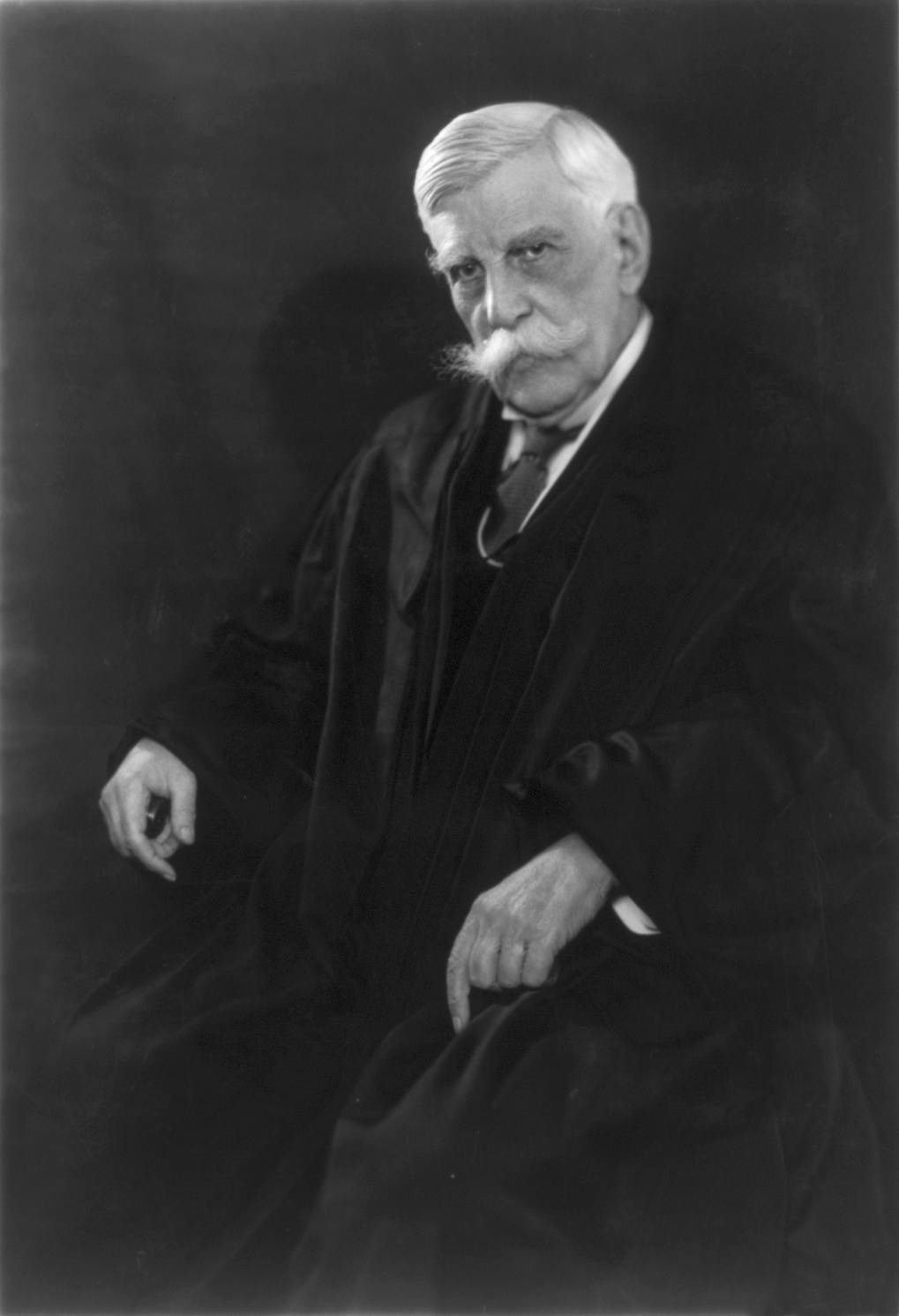
Holmes

David Wright argued that the Covenant Code of Exodus 20:23–23:19 was directly, primarily, and throughout dependent upon the Laws of Hammurabi.

Explaining the origins of the law that one can see in the Cities of Refuge, Justice Oliver Wendell Holmes Jr. wrote that early forms of legal procedure were grounded in vengeance. Roman law and German law started from the blood feud, which led to the composition, at first optional, then compulsory, by which the feud was bought off. Holmes reported that in Anglo-Saxon practice, the feud was pretty well broken up by the time of William the Conqueror. The killings and house-burnings of an earlier day became the appeals of mayhem and arson, and then the legal actions now familiar to lawyers.

Writing for the Committee on Jewish Law and Standards of Conservative Judaism, Rabbis Elliot N. Dorff and Aaron L. Mackler relied on Exodus 21:19–20, among other verses, to find a duty to help see that our society provides health care to those who need it. Dorff and Mackler noted that the Rabbis found the authorization and requirement to heal in several verses, including Exodus 21:19–20, according to which an assailant must insure that his victim is "thoroughly healed," and Deuteronomy 22:2, "And you shall restore the lost property to him." Dorff and Mackler reported that the Talmud read Exodus 21:19–20 as giving permission physicians to cure.

Exodus 21:32 reports a penalty of 30 shekels of silver. This table translates units of weight used in the Bible into their modern equivalents:

Weight Measurements in the Bible
Unit	Texts	Ancient Equivalent	Modern Equivalent
gerah (גֵּרָה)	Exodus 30:13; Leviticus 27:25; Numbers 3:47; 18:16; Ezekiel 45:12	1/20 shekel	0.6 gram; 0.02 ounce
bekah (בֶּקַע)	Genesis 24:22; Exodus 38:26	10 gerahs; half shekel	6 grams; 0.21 ounce
pim (פִים)	1 Samuel 13:21	2/3 shekel	8 grams; 0.28 ounce
shekel (שֶּׁקֶל)	Exodus 21:32; 30:13, 15, 24; 38:24, 25, 26, 29	20 gerahs; 2 bekahs	12 grams; 0.42 ounce
mina (maneh, מָּנֶה)	1 Kings 10:17; Ezekiel 45:12; Ezra 2:69; Nehemiah 7:70	50 shekels	0.6 kilogram; 1.32 pounds
talent (kikar, כִּכָּר)	Exodus 25:39; 37:24; 38:24, 25, 27, 29	3,000 shekels; 60 minas	36 kilograms; 79.4 pounds

=== Exodus chapter 22 ===
Benjamin Sommer taught that an ancient reader inserted a clarifying comment into Exodus 22:24. Sommer wrote that Exodus 22:24 originally read, "If you lend money to My עַם, am, do not act toward them as a creditor; exact no interest from them," but because the Hebrew word עַם, am, usually means "people," but can also mean "the poor" or "common folk, peasantry" (as in Isaiah 3:15; Psalm 72:2; and Nehemiah 5:1), to make clear that the second of these meanings was to be understood, a later scribe added the words "to the poor among you" immediately after עַם, am.

=== Exodus chapter 23 ===
Exodus 23:12 restates the law of the Sabbath. in 1950, the Committee on Jewish Law and Standards of Conservative Judaism ruled: "Refraining from the use of a motor vehicle is an important aid in the maintenance of the Sabbath spirit of repose. Such restraint aids, moreover, in keeping the members of the family together on the Sabbath. However where a family resides beyond reasonable walking distance from the synagogue, the use of a motor vehicle for the purpose of synagogue attendance shall in no wise be construed as a violation of the Sabbath but, on the contrary, such attendance shall be deemed an expression of loyalty to our faith. . . . [I]n the spirit of a living and developing Halachah responsive to the changing needs of our people, we declare it to be permitted to use electric lights on the Sabbath for the purpose of enhancing the enjoyment of the Sabbath, or reducing personal discomfort in the performance of a mitzvah."

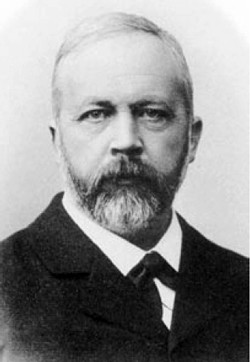
Wellhausen

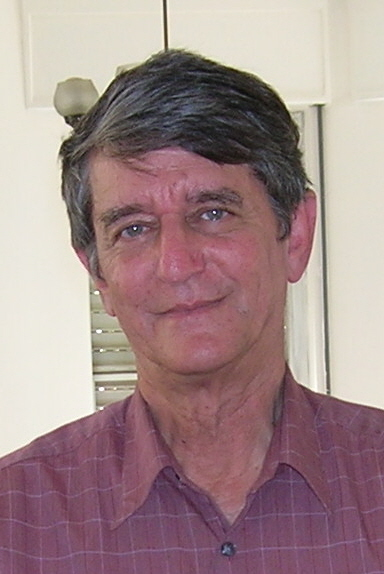
Kugel

Julius Wellhausen conceived of early Israelite religion as linked to nature's annual cycle and believed that Scripture only later connected the festivals to historical events like the Exodus from Egypt. James Kugel reported that modern scholars generally agreed that Passover reflects two originally separate holidays arising out of the annual harvest cycle. One Festival involved the sacrificing and eating of an animal from the flock, the pesa sacrifice, which arose among shepherds who sacrificed in the light of the full moon of the month that marked the vernal equinox and the end of winter (as directed in Exodus 12:6) to bring Divine favor for a safe and prosperous summer for the rest of the flock. The shepherds slaughtered the animal at home, as the rite also stipulated that some of the animal's blood be daubed on the doorposts and lintel of the house (as directed in Exodus 12:7) to ward off evil. The rite prescribed that no bone be broken (as directed in Exodus 12:46) so as not to bring evil on the flock from which the sacrifice came. Scholars suggest that the name pesa derived from the verb that means "hop" (as in 1 Kings 18:21 and 26), and theorize that the holiday may originally have involved some sort of ritual "hopping." A second Festival—the Festival of Unleavened Bread—involved farmers eating unleavened barley bread for seven days when the winter's barley crop had reached maturity and was ready for harvest. Farmers observed this Festival with a trip to a local sanctuary (as in Exodus 23:17 and 34:23). Modern scholars believe that the absence of yeast in the bread indicated purity (as in Leviticus 2:11). The listing of Festivals in Exodus 23:14–17 and 34:18–23 appear to provide evidence for the independent existence of the Festival of Unleavened Bread. Modern scholars suggest that the farmers' Festival of Unleavened Bread and the shepherds' Passover later merged into a single festival, Passover moved from the home to the Temple, and the combined festival was explicitly connected to the Exodus (as in Deuteronomy 16:1–4).

Shakespeare

=== Exodus chapter 24 ===
Harold Fisch argued that the revelation and covenant at Mount Sinai memorialized in Exodus 24 is echoed in Prince Hamlet's meeting with his dead father's ghost in Hamlet 1.5 of William Shakespeare's play Hamlet. Fisch noted that in both cases, a father appears to issue a command, only one is called to hear the command, others stay at a distance in terror, the commandment is recorded, and the parties enter into a covenant.

Noting numerous connotations of the word "Torah" (תּוֹרָה) in the Pentateuch, Ephraim Speiser wrote that the word is based on a verbal stem signifying "to teach, guide," and the like, and thus in Exodus 24:12, refers to general precepts and sayings, and in context cannot be mistaken for the title of the Pentateuch as a whole. Speiser argued that Exodus 24:12 refers to the Covenant Code (Exodus 21–23), which Exodus 34:1 indicates was inscribed on two stone tablets and thus necessarily restricted in length.

Moshe Greenberg wrote that one may see the entire Exodus story as "the movement of the fiery manifestation of the divine presence." Similarly, William Propp identified fire (אֵשׁ, esh) as the medium in which God appears on the terrestrial plane—in the Burning Bush of Exodus 3:2, the cloud pillar of Exodus 13:21–22 and 14:24, atop Mount Sinai in Exodus 19:18 and 24:17, and upon the Tabernacle in Exodus 40:38.

Everett Fox noted that "glory" (כְּבוֹד, kevod) and "stubbornness" (כָּבֵד לֵב, kaved lev) are leading words throughout the book of Exodus that give it a sense of unity. Similarly, Propp identified the root kvd—connoting heaviness, glory, wealth, and firmness—as a recurring theme in Exodus: Moses suffered from a heavy mouth in Exodus 4:10 and heavy arms in Exodus 17:12; Pharaoh had firmness of heart in Exodus 7:14; 8:11, 28; 9:7, 34; and 10:1; Pharaoh made Israel's labor heavy in Exodus 5:9; God in response sent heavy plagues in Exodus 8:20; 9:3, 18, 24; and 10:14, so that God might be glorified over Pharaoh in Exodus 14:4, 17, and 18; and the book culminates with the descent of God's fiery Glory, described as a "heavy cloud," first upon Sinai and later upon the Tabernacle in Exodus 19:16; 24:16–17; 29:43; 33:18, 22; and 40:34–38.

Diagram of the Documentary Hypothesis

== In critical analysis ==
Some scholars who follow the Documentary Hypothesis find evidence of four separate sources in the parashah. Richard Elliott Friedman attributed the overwhelming majority of the parashah, Exodus 21:1–24:15a, to the Elohist (sometimes abbreviated E), who wrote in the north, in the land of the Tribe of Ephraim, possibly as early as the second half of the 9th century BCE. Friedman attributed Exodus 24:15b–18a to the Priestly source, who wrote in the 6th or 5th century BCE. Friedman attributed the words "and went up into the mountain" in Exodus 24:18 to a later Redactor (sometimes abbreviated R). And Friedman attributed the conclusion of Exodus 24:18, the words "and Moses was in the mount forty days and forty nights," to the Jahwist (sometimes abbreviated J), who wrote in the south, in the land of the Tribe of Judah, possibly as early as the 10th century BCE.

== Commandments ==
According to the Sefer ha-Chinuch, there are 23 positive and 30 negative commandments in the parashah:

- To purchase a Hebrew slave in accordance with the prescribed laws
- To betroth the Jewish maidservant
- To redeem Jewish maidservants
- The master must not sell his Jewish maidservant.
- Not to withhold food, clothing, or sexual relations from one's wife
- The courts must execute by strangulation those who deserve it.
- Not to strike one's father or mother
- The court must implement laws against the one who assaults another or damages another's property.

- The court must carry out the death penalty of the sword.
- The court must judge the damages incurred by a goring ox.
- Not to benefit from an ox condemned to be stoned.
- The court must judge the damages incurred by a pit.
- The court must implement punitive measures against the thief.
- The court must judge the damages incurred by an animal eating.
- The court must judge the damages incurred by fire.
- The courts must carry out the laws of an unpaid guard.
- The courts must carry out the laws of the plaintiff, admitter, or denier.
- The courts must carry out the laws of a hired worker and hired guard.
- The courts must carry out the laws of a borrower.
- The court must fine one who seduces a maiden.
- The court must not let the sorcerer live.
- Not to insult or harm a sincere convert with words
- Not to cheat a sincere convert monetarily
- Not to afflict any orphan or widow
- To lend to the poor and destitute
- Not to press them for payment if you know they don't have it
- Not to intermediate in an interest loan, guarantee, witness, or write the promissory note
- Not to curse judges
- Not to blaspheme
- Not to curse the head of state or leader of the Sanhedrin
- Not to preface one tithe to the next, but separate them in their proper order
- Not to eat meat of an animal that was mortally wounded
- Judges must not accept testimony unless both parties are present.
- Transgressors must not testify.
- The court must not execute through a majority of one; at least a majority of two is required.

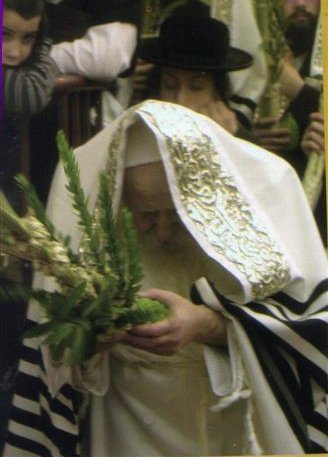
Celebrating Sukkot

- A judge who presented an acquittal plea must not present an argument for conviction in capital cases.
- To decide by majority in case of disagreement
- Not to pity a poor man in judgment
- To help another remove the load from a beast which can no longer carry it
- A judge must not decide unjustly the case of the habitual transgressor.
- The court must not kill anybody on circumstantial evidence.
- Judges must not accept bribes.
- To leave free all produce that grew in the Sabbatical year
- To rest on the Sabbath
- Not to swear in the name of an idol
- Not to turn Israelites to idolatry
- To celebrate on the three Festivals of Passover, Shavuot, and Sukkot
- Not to slaughter the Passover lamb while in possession of leaven
- Not to leave the fat overnight
- To set aside the firstfruits and bring them to the Temple
- Not to eat meat and milk cooked together
- Not to make any treaty with the seven nations to be extirpated, or with any idol worshiper
- Not to let them dwell in our land

== In the liturgy ==
The laws of the servant in Exodus 21:1–11 provide an application of the tenth of the Thirteen Rules for interpreting the Torah in the Baraita of Rabbi Ishmael that many Jews read as part of the readings before the Pesukei d'Zimrah prayer service. The tenth rule provides that an item included in a generalization that is then singled out to discuss something of a kind different from the generalization is singled out to be more lenient and more stringent. Exodus 21:1–6 describes the laws of the Jewish indentured servant, who goes free after six years. Then Exodus 21:7–11 turns to the female Jewish indentured servant, who one might have thought was included in the generalization about Jewish indentured servants. Instead, Exodus 21:7 says that her avenues to freedom are not as those of her male counterpart. Rather, the Torah applies a more lenient rule to the female Jewish indentured servant, as she may go free before six years have passed—upon the onset of puberty or the death of her master. And Exodus 21:7–11 also applies a more stringent rule to the female Jewish indentured servant, as she may be betrothed against her will to the master or his son.

And the laws of trespass in Exodus 22:8 provide an example of the sixth of the Thirteen Rules for interpreting the Torah in the Baraita of Rabbi Ishmael. The sixth rule provides that when a generalization is followed by a specification followed by another generalization, one may not infer anything except that which is like the specification. One might read the generalizations to teach that all things are included, but the specification implies that only the specific items are included. The rule resolves the apparent contradiction by inferring that everything is included, provided it is similar to the items specified. Thus, Exodus 22:8 begins by referring to "every matter of trespass" and concludes by referring to "any manner of lost thing"—two generalizations. But between the two generalizations, Exodus 22:8 refers to a number of specific items—"for ox, for donkey, for sheep, for garment." Applying the sixth rule teaches that the fine applies to movable things with intrinsic value—like an ox, donkey, sheep, or garment—but not to immovable real estate and not to contracts, which have no intrinsic value.

Some Jews recite Exodus 23:20 three times as part of the Wayfarer's Prayer (Tefilat HaDerech), said on setting out on a journey.

Some Jews recite the words "we will do, and we will obey" in Exodus 24:7 as part of the song (zemer) Yom Shabbaton sung at the Sabbath day meal.

== The Weekly Maqam ==
In the Weekly Maqam, Sephardic Jews each week base the songs of the services on the content of that week's parashah. For Parashat Mishpatim, Sephardic Jews apply Maqam Saba, the maqam that symbolizes the covenant between man and God. By following commandments, one obeys God's covenant, and therefore in this parashah, with its multitude of commandments, Sephardi Jews apply Maqam Saba.

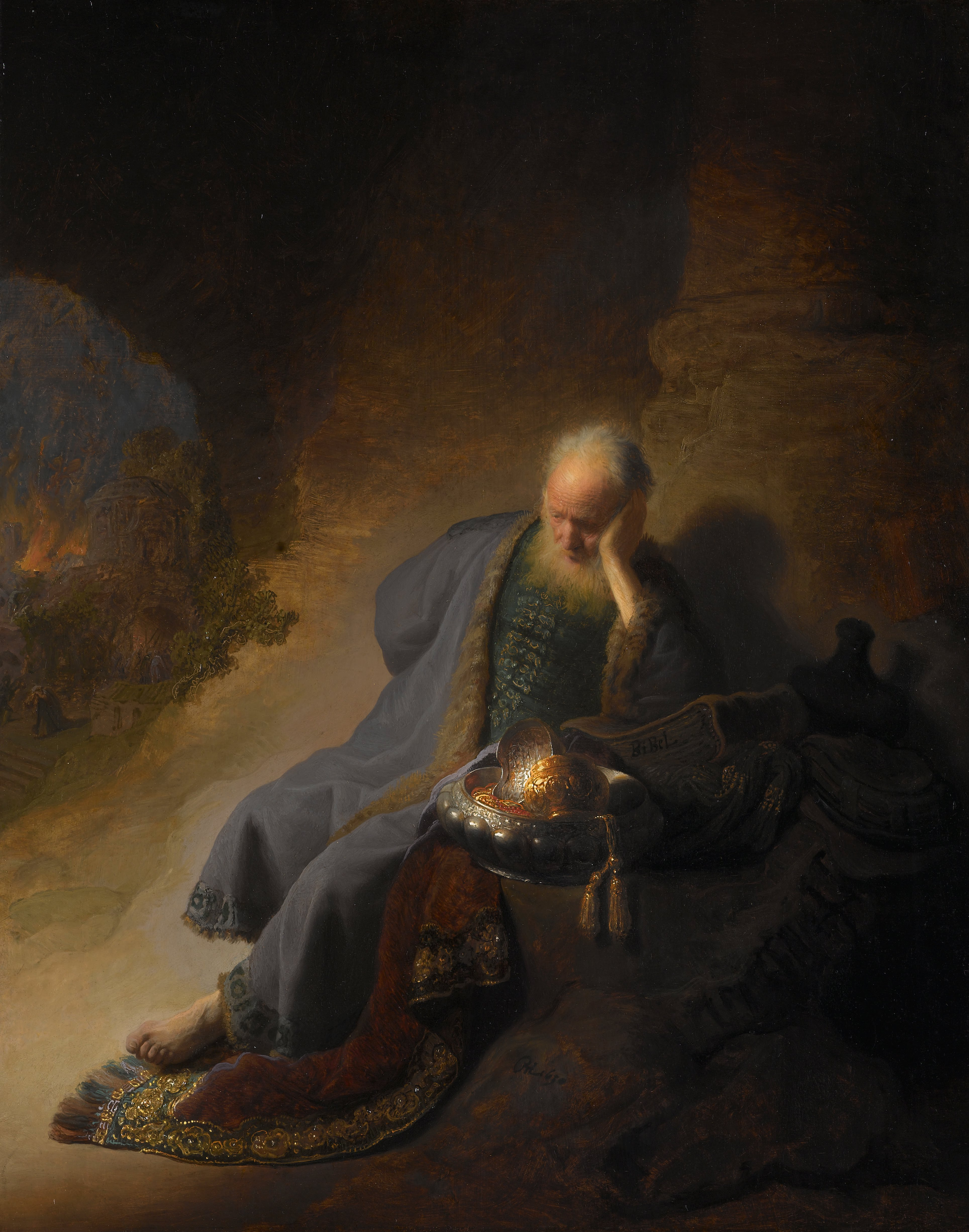
Jeremiah Lamenting the Destruction of Jerusalem (1630 painting by Rembrandt)

== Haftarah ==
=== Generally ===
The haftarah for the parashah is Jeremiah 34:8–22 and 33:25–26.

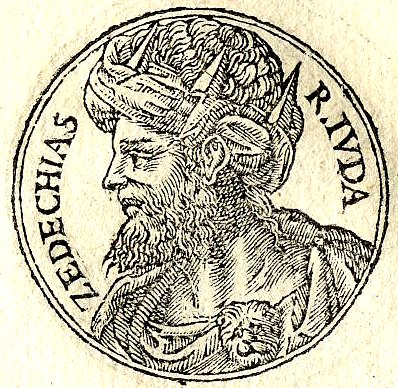
Zedekiah (1553 etching published by Guillaume Rouille)

==== Summary ====
The word of the Lord came to Jeremiah after King Zedekiah made a covenant with the people of Jerusalem to proclaim liberty, that all should let their Hebrew slaves—both men and women—go free, and that none should make bondmen of them. All the princes and people listened and let their Hebrew slaves go free, but afterwards they turned and caused their servants whom they had freed to return to subjugation.

Therefore, the word of the Lord came to Jeremiah, saying that God had made a covenant with the Israelites' forefathers when God brought them out of the land of Egypt and out of the house of bondage that in the seventh year they must let every Hebrew slave go free, but their forefathers did not listen. The people had turned and done what is right in God's eyes, proclaiming liberty to their neighbors, making a covenant before God in the Temple. But the people turned again and profaned God's name, causing their servants whom they had freed to return to subjugation as servants once again. Therefore, God said that as the people had not listened to God to proclaim liberty to their neighbors, God would proclaim for the people liberty to the sword, pestilence, and famine, and would make them a horror to all the kingdoms of the earth. God would give over to their enemies the princes of Judah, the princes of Jerusalem, the officers, the priests, and all the people of the land who had transgressed God's covenant, who had sealed the covenant by cutting a calf in half and passing between the two parts of the calf, and their dead bodies would be food for scavengers. And God would give Zedekiah and his princes into the hand of the king of Babylon, who would return to burn Jerusalem and lay desolate the cities of Judah.

The Haftarah concludes by returning to Jeremiah 33:25–26, reporting that God said that as surely as God had decreed the ordinances of heaven and earth, God would not cast away the descendants of Jacob and David, but God would make from among them rulers of the descendants of Abraham, Isaac, and Jacob; for God would have compassion on them and end their captivity.

==== Connection to the Parashah ====
Both the parashah and the haftarah address the law requiring the release of Hebrew slaves. Both the parashah and the haftarah use the words "Hebrew" (ivri), "slave" or "servant" (eved), "free" (chofshi), and "covenant" (brit). The haftarah quotes the parashah. And the haftarah recites the setting of the parashah (described in the previous parashah), the time at which God brought the Israelites "out of the land of Egypt, out of the house of bondage."

=== On Shabbat Shekalim ===
When the parashah is read on Shabbat Shekalim (as in 2023, 2026, 2028, and 2029), even if such Shabbat coincides with Shabbat Rosh Chodesh or Shabbat Machar Chodesh, the haftarah is 2 Kings 12:1–17 for Ashkenazim. The haftarah is 2 Kings 11:17-12:17 for Sephardim.

=== On Shabbat Rosh Chodesh ===
When the parashah is read on Shabbat Rosh Chodesh, if such Shabbat is not also Shabbat Shekalim (as in 2024), the haftarah is Isaiah 66:1–24.

=== On Shabbat Machar Chodesh ===
When the parashah is read on Shabbat Machar Chodesh, if such Shabbat is not also Shabbat Shekalim (as in 2027 and 2030), the haftarah is 1 Samuel 20:18–42.
