= Abin I =

Jewish Amora sage

R. Abin (I) (Hebrew: רבי אבין) was a Jewish Amora sage of the Land of Israel, of the third generation of Amoraim.

== Biography ==
He was one of R. Yochanan bar Nafcha's most prominent pupils. As a young man he even managed to study under Judah ha-Nasi, and had delivered statements in his name. However, he acquired most of his Torah knowledge from his principle teacher R. Yochanan bar Nafcha.

Abin's sayings are mentioned many times in the Babylonian Talmud, mainly as an halakhic inquiry (Hebrew: בעי). As he lived in the Land of Israel, he is also cited frequently in the Jerusalem Talmud. His son was Jose ben Abin.

Among the amoraim named "Abin", R. Abin is the only one who is known simply by his name. In contrast, Babylonian amoraim name Abin have another nickname or epithet attached to their name, for example R. Abin Naggara (the father of Idi b. Abin Abin Naggara and Hiyya b. Abin Naggara) and Rabin (whose real name was "R. Abin", as cited in the Jerusalem Talmud).

Among his colleagues was Jeremiah (I), who was one of the elders pupils of Yochanan bar Nafcha, and said to R. Abbahu that for this reason his and Jeremiah (I), Abin I, and R. Measha's opinions should be preferred over the opinions of R. Abbahu, R. Isaac Nappaha, and R. Hanina bar Papi.

== People with similar names ==
For the 4th generation Amora traveler, see R. Abin (amora). For the 4th generation Amora sages of Babylon, see Idi b. Abin Naggara, Hiyya b. Abin Naggara, or their Father of the 3d generation: Abin Naggara. For the fifth generation Amora sage of the Land of Israel, see Jose ben Abin (his son). For the 6th generation Amora sage of the Land of Israel, see Samuel b. Jose b. Boon (his grandson). Some commentators distinguish Abin I from Abin of N'shiqya, mentioned b. Shabbat 121b. Other translate that passage. " ... traveled from N'shiqya to the house of Abin".
