= Abin =

Abin or ABIN may refer to:

- Abin Sur, a fictional character in DC Comics
- Rabbi Abin I, Jewish Talmudist
- Jose ben Abin (4th century), Jewish Talmudist
- Idi b. Abin Abin Naggara (4th century), Jewish Talmudist
- Hiyya b. Abin Naggara, Jewish Talmudist
- Aba people, an ethnic group in Siberia
- ABIN, the intelligence agency of Brazil
