= Papi (name) =

Notable people with the name Papi include:

== Surname ==
- Hanina b. Papi (fl. 3rd or 4th century), Jewish Amora sage
- Rav Papi (fl. 4th century), Jewish Amora sage
- Abdolmohammad Papi (born 1987), Iranian Greco-Roman wrestler
- Claude Papi (1949–1983), French footballer
- Gennaro Papi (1886–1941), Italian opera conductor
- Hossein Papi (born 1985), Iranian footballer
- Mike Papi (born 1992), American minor league baseball player
- Samuele Papi (born 1973), Italian volleyball player
- Stan Papi (born 1951), American former Major League Baseball player

== Given name ==
- Papi Khomane (born 1975), South African former footballer
- Papi Kimoto (born 1976), Congolese retired footballer
- Papi Turgeman (born 1970), Israeli basketball player
- Papi Zothwane (born 1981), South African footballer

== Nickname ==
- Edgar Martinez, (born 1963) Major League Baseball player
- Auston Matthews (born 1997), American ice hockey player
- David Ortiz, (born 1975), Major League Baseball player, nickname "Big Papi"
- Papi Oviedo (born 1937), Cuban musician
- Jasiel Rivero (born 1993), Cuban basketball player for Maccabi Tel Aviv of the Israeli Basketball Premier League
- Papi Sanchez (born 1975), Dominican merengue singer and rapper
- Jiang Yilei (born 1987), Chinese comedian, online moniker "Papi Jiang"

== See also ==
- Max Papis, Italian racing driver
