= Rabbi Isaac Nappaha =

Member of the second generation of Amoraim

Rabbi Isaac Nappaha (Hebrew: רבי יצחק נפחא, romanized: Rabbi Yitzhak Nappaḥa), or Isaac the smith, was a rabbi of the 3rd–4th centuries (second generation of Amoraim) who lived in Galilee.

== Name ==
He is found under the name "Nappaha" only in the Babylonian Talmud, not in the Talmud Yerushalmi. In the later midrashic literature he is called Yitzchak Nappaha, whereas the older works call him only R. Yitzchak.

In the Babylonian Talmud he is identified with various other Yitzchaks, and since that was due to the arbitrary action of a later amora, the real name of his father can no longer be determined.

Regarding the name "Nappaha" (the smith), there had been an older Yitzchak of the same name, who was rich and who is said to have owned five courts in Usha. It has not yet been possible, however, to ascertain any relationship between the two. If the elder was an ancestor of this Yitzchak, the younger could well have inherited the name without ever having practised the trade.

== Biography ==
He was a pupil of Johanan bar Nappaha. Reish Lakish once used the similarity in their names as the material for wordplay. Isaac's daughter married the Babylonian amora Pappi. Tradition records him teaching in Antioch.

Although he was a pupil of Johanan bar Nappaha, his associations with Johanan are indicated in only one passage, which tells of his once appearing before Johanan. As a traditionist of the aggadah of Johanan, he appears only in the Babylonian Talmud. He was in Babylonia only temporarily, probably soon after the death of Johanan; and while there he visited the house of the exilarch, together with Rav Sheshet and Rav Yosef. Rava quoted in his name; but sometimes tradition maintains that it is uncertain whether the sayings originated with Yitzchak or with Rava. Rabbin bar Adda also cites in his name.

His home was originally in Caesarea, but he afterward went to Tiberias to live. He associated intimately with Rabbi Ammi, with whom he often discussed halakhic questions; and together they sometimes rendered decisions in matters pertaining to religious law. Yitzchak, Abbahu, and Hanina b. Papi constituted a board of judges. Rabbi Helbo referred to Yitzchak two liturgical questions addressed to him from Galilee: the first question he answered immediately; the second he expounded publicly in the academy. A thesis on the creation of light, formulated anonymously, was made public by R. Yitzchak. He also engaged in aggadic discussions with Levi II; with Abba bar Kahana; with Rabbi Aha; and with Hiyya bar Abba. Among those who transmitted in the name of Yitzchak were the famous halakhist Haggai, the latter's sons Jonathan and Azariah, and Luliani ben Tabrin.

== Teachings ==
That Yitzchak was a great authority on halakhah, as well as aggadah, is shown by an anecdote which is told and according to which Ammi and Assi would not let him speak, because the one wished to hear halakhah and the other aggadah. So after telling them the celebrated story (also known from Aesop's Fables) of the man who had two wives, one of whom pulled out all his white hairs because she was young, whereas the other extracted his black hairs because she was old, R. Yitzchak presented to them an aggadah with a halakhic background, in order to satisfy both at the same time.

However, Yitzchak devoted himself to aggadah with more zeal, because he regarded it as a necessity in the adverse circumstances of the Jews. The poverty of the Jews of Palestine had increased to such an extent that people no longer waited for the harvest, but ate the green ears of wheat; consequently they were in need of comfort and refreshment of soul. Yitzchak tried to make his lectures as effective as possible, and they show him to have been an unusually forceful rhetorician and a skillful exegete.

Yitzchak's aggadic material may be divided according to contents into the following four groups:

1. Proverbs and dicta: concerning sins; concerning the relation of man to God; on the relation of man to his fellow beings; concerning prayer; concerning study and the Law; concerning Israel; concerning the nations; concerning Jerusalem.
2. Exegesis: general; halakhic; Biblical personages; Biblical narratives
3. Homiletics
4. Proems; maxims; similes; messianic subjects; eschatology

=== The calendar ===
According to the unanimous testimony of several writers of the tenth century, the gaon Hai b. David ascribed to Yitzchak Nappaha the calculation of the Rabbinite calendar.

Karaite tradition, borrowed from the Rabbanites, credits Isaac with declaring new months not by observing the Moon, but like the Rabbanites computing according to the rule of lo, bet, dalet, waw which meant that Passover can never begin on a Monday, or a Wednesday, or a Friday.
