= Abba bar Kahana =

Babylonian Talmud rabbi

Rabbi Abba bar Kahana
- רבי אבא בר כהנא

Personal life
- Born: Babylonia
- Parent: Rav Kahana II (father)
- Education: Beit midrash of Rabbi Hiyya bar Ashi
- Known for: amora of the 3rd generation, many aggadic teachings

Religious life
- Religion: Judaism

Senior posting
- Teacher: Rabbi Hiyya bar Ashi, Rabbi Helbo, Rabbi Yehoshua ben Levi
- Based in: Land of Israel
- Students: Rabbi Berekiah

Rabbi Abba bar Kahana (Hebrew: רבי אבא בר כהנא) was an amora of the 3rd generation.

His father was Rav Kahana II. He was born in Babylonia, and learned in the beit midrash of Rabbi Hiyya bar Ashi. He moved to the Land of Israel while Rabbi Hanina bar Hama was still alive.

His teachers include Rabbi Helbo and Rabbi Yehoshua ben Levi. His colleagues include Levi II and Rabbi Zeira. Rabbi Berekiah cited many teaching in his name, and apparently was his student.

He is principally known for his many aggadic teachings.
