= Jose of Yokereth =

R. Jose of Yokereth (Hebrew: יוסי דמן יוקרת, read as Yossi deman Yoqart) was a Jewish Amora sage of the Land of Israel, of the third generation of the Amora era.

His surname יוקרת (Yoqart or Yokereth) is of an unknown source, and most likely has been bastardized over the years, although many attribute it to the now and then Iqrit village, known in Hebrew as יוקרת (Yokereth or Yoqart).

== Biography ==
He was the Rabbi of R. Jose ben Abin.

In the Talmud there are two stories concerning his piousness that reached to such an extent that he was cruel to his own children over it. One story concerns his son, who miraculously caused a tree to produce fruit out of season to feed his laborers. When his father learned of it, he was furious, and said to him: "My son, you have troubled your Creator to cause the fig tree to bring forth its fruits before its time, may you too be taken hence before your time!". The other story concerns his beautiful daughter. Once R. Yokereth caught a man trying to glance at his daughter from a hiding place. Replying to the questioning of Yokereth, he said: "Master, if I am not worthy enough to marry her, may I not at least be worthy to catch a glimpse of her?"; then R. Yokereth exclaimed: "My daughter, you are a source of trouble to mankind; return to the dust so that men may not sin because of you". This zealotry led his own student R. Jose ben Abin to abandon him, and go acquire education from Rav Ashi.

An additional miraculous story concerning R. Yokereth is recorded. He used to rent his donkey to people, and at the end of each working day it would return by itself, with its salary laid on its back. One day, the renters forgot two of their sandals on its back. The donkey, not wanting to steal, did not move until the sandals were retrieved.
