= Rav Kahana II =

For other Amoraic sages of Babylonia with the name "Rav Kahana", see Rav Kahana.

Rav Kahana (II) (Hebrew: רב כהנא (השני), read as Rav Kahana (Ha-sheni), lit. "Rabbi Kahana (II)"; recorded in the Talmud merely as Rav Kahana) was an Amora of the second generation, active in Babylon and in the Land of Israel.

== Biography ==
He was a student of Rav.

According to the Geonim tradition, Rav Kahana was the stepson of Rav from his second wife. Despite his name, which usually means "Kohen", he was not a Kohen.

His son was Rabbi Abba bar Kahana.

It is told that once Kahana hid underneath the bed of his teacher Rav while Rav and his wife were engaging in sexual intercourse. When Rav noticed this he was angered, but Kahana justified his presence by saying "It is Torah, and I need to learn it." Another time, Kahana was reciting Biblical verses before Rav. When he reached Ecclesiastes 12:5, which (in this rabbinic interpretation) refers to the cessation of a person's sexual desire in old age, Rav sighed. Kahana said, "We can conclude from this that Rav's sexual desire has ceased."

He was considered unusually handsome: it was said that his beauty recalled the beauty of Rabbi Abbahu, which in turn recalled the beauty of the patriarch Jacob.
