= Luliani ben Tabrin =

Jewish scholar of beginning of fourth century

Luliani ben Tabrin was a Jewish scholar of the beginning of the fourth century, one of the amoraim of the third generation, in the Land of Israel.

His name, which is the equivalent of "Julianus ben Tiberianus," has been corrupted into יולימנא בן עבדי in Pesikta Rabbati. His father's name, the usual form of which is טברין, is written also טברינאי and טורין.

Luliani is frequently mentioned in pre-Talmudic literature and in the Midrash. He is particularly known as the transmitter of aggadot of his teacher, Isaac Nappaha. One aggadah is ascribed to Luliani himself: "When the lesser people listen to the great and yet the latter do not alleviate the burden of the former, they shall account for it to God". However, a similar teaching is elsewhere ascribed to R. Isaac. Luliani is mentioned also as having asked his teacher Isaac a halakhic question.

The statement of Midrash Tehillim that Luliani transmitted an aggadah of R. Ishmael is apparently a mistake due to the abbreviation ר"י.

Luliani was the father of the Hiyya ben Luliani who is frequently mentioned in the Jerusalem Talmud and who is stated to have caused rain to fall in time of drought.
