= Jose ben Abin =

Jose b. Abin (Hebrew: יוסי בר אבין, read as Yossi bar[Son of] Abin (Yer. Talmud); or alternative name recorded in the B. Talmud: Jose, the son of R. Boon [Bun], in Hebrew: יוסי ברבי בון, read as Yossi BeRabbi[Son of Rabbi] Bon) was a Jewish Talmudist, known as an amora of the fifth generation (4th century CE) who lived in the Galilee in the Land of Israel. He was the son of Rabban Abin I and the teacher of Abin II. He was at first the pupil of Rabbi Jose of Yodqart, but the latter's indifference to his own family caused Jose to leave him and follow Assi. Jose was the most important among the last Halakhists of the amoraim of the Land of Israel. He had a thorough knowledge not only of the Judean customs and halakhot, but of the Babylonian, a fact that has led some scholars to maintain that Jose must have resided at some time in Babylonia. It is probable, however, that he derived his knowledge of Babylonian teaching from his father, who had traveled in Babylonia.

Jose's chief work in the field of the Halakhah was the expounding of the Mishnah and the halakhot of the Amoraim, though some halakhot are credited to him. In aggadah he excelled in the transmission and elucidation of the sayings of his predecessors, especially those of Hiyya, Joshua ben Levi, Yohanan and Simeon ben Lakish.

His chief halakic opponents were Mana II and Jose ben Zebida.

== See also ==
- Abin I (his father), 3rd generation Amora sage of the Land of Israel
- Samuel b. Jose b. Boon (his son), 6th generation Amora sage of the Land of Israel

== Resources ==
- Waldstein, A.; Schechter, Solomon (1901–1906). "Jose b. Abin". Jewish Encyclopedia. Vol. 7. New York: Funk and Wagnalls. p. 240.; which cites:
  - Bacher, Ag. Pal. Amor. iii. 724 et seq.;
  - Weiss, Dor, iii. 117 et seq.;
  - Heilprin, Seder ha-Dorot, ii. 224;
  - Frankel, Mebo, 102a;
  - Halevy, Dorot ha-Rishonim, iii. 122, et seq.
