= Hiyya bar Ashi =

- רב חייא בר אשי

Personal life
- Born: Hiyya bar Ashi
- Era: Second and third generation of amoraim

Religious life
- Religion: Judaism

Jewish leader
- Teacher: Rav

Hiyya bar Ashi (or Rav Hiyya bar Ashi; Hebrew: רב חייא בר אשי) was a second and third generation Amora sage of Babylon.

== Biography ==
In his youth he studied under Rav, and served as his janitor. In his service of Rav he learned many laws, which he transmitted to future generations. For example, he stated that on Shabbat he would wash Rav's leather clothes. From this statement, the sages concluded that the law of Melabain (Scouring/Laundering) on Shabbat does not apply on leather materials. He also stated that when he used to wake Rav from his sleep, he would wash his hands, recite Birkat HaTorah, and only then would teach the lesson. Hence, one should make a Birkat HaTorah also on the Talmud, and not only on the Bible. Later, R. Hiyya bar Ashi said, Rav would put on tefillin, and then recite the shema; from this the sages concluded that one should put on tefillin before the shema, even if it is already time for the shema.

Most of R. Hiyya bar Ashi's statements are made in the name of his teacher Rav, and rarely in the name of Samuel of Nehardea. At times his own rulings are cited as well, and sometimes he disputes his teacher Rav.

He was a colleague of Rav Huna and had debated him over rulings of their common teacher, Rav.

The death of R. Hiyya bar Ashi is narrated in Kiddushin 81b: Rabbi Hiyya Bar Ashi was accustomed to say, whenever he would fall on his face in prayer: May the Merciful One save us from the evil inclination. One day his wife heard him saying this prayer. She said: After all, it has been several years since he has withdrawn from engaging in intercourse with me due to his advanced years. What is the reason that he says this prayer, as there is no concern that he will engage in sinful sexual behavior? One day, while he was studying in his garden, his wife adorned herself and repeatedly walked past him. He said: Who are you? She said: I am Ḥaruta, a well-known prostitute, returning from my day at work. He propositioned her. She said to him: Give me that pomegranate from the top of the tree as payment. He leapt up, went, and brought it to her, and they engaged in intercourse. When he came home, his wife was lighting a fire in the oven. He went and sat inside it. She said to him: What is this? He said to her: Such and such an incident occurred; he told her that he engaged in intercourse with a prostitute. She said to him: It was I. He paid no attention to her, thinking she was merely trying to comfort him, until she gave him signs that it was indeed she. He said to her: I, in any event, intended to transgress." Apparently Rav Hiyya is burned to death in the oven. According to Jeffrey Rubenstein, an additional line appearing in printed Talmuds has been added that Hiyya fasted for the rest of his life to atone for his sin, avoiding the tragic suicide, but "it does not appear in Talmudic manuscripts and is not part of the original story."
