= Abin Naggara =

3rd generation Babylonian Amora

- רבי אבין נגרא

Personal life
- Children: Idi b. Abin Naggara Hiyya b. Abin Naggara
- Era: Third generation of amoraim

Religious life
- Religion: Judaism

Rabbi Abin Naggara (the Carpenter) (Hebrew: אבין נגרא) was a second- or third-generation Babylonian Amora, a contemporary of Rav Huna. He was the father of Rav Idi b. Abin and Rav Hiyya b. Abin. He made his livelihood as a carpenter and was named for his profession.

He devoted his nights to Torah study.

== Views on the Sabbath ==
The Talmud says that he was very strict about Shabbat lights, and when Rav Huna saw his meticulous practice, he said that he would have two righteous children come from his house, who turned out to be Rav Idi (Rav Pappa's teacher) and Rav Hiyya, who were among the great Torah scholars of the fourth-generation Amoraim.

Tosefot (ad loc.) explain that both he and his wife were both meticulous about Shabbat candles, and therefore they merited to two righteous children.

R. Huna was accustomed frequently to pass the door of R. Abin the carpenter. Seeing that he habitually lit many lights, he remarked, Two great men will issue hence. R. Idi b. Abin and R. Hiyya b. Abin issued thence.

Midrash Shmuel 27:1 cites to "Rebbi Bun Nagri" which may be a reference to Rabbi Abin Naggari.
