= Idi b. Abin Naggara =

4th century Jewish Babylonian rabbi

Rav Idi bar Abin Naggara (or Idi bar Abin, or Idi ben Abin, or Rav Idi b. Avin (I), or Ada bar Abin) was a Jewish Babylonian rabbi who lived around 350 CE (fourth generation of amoraim).

== Biography ==
He was the son of Abin Naggara, who likely worked as a carpenter (Naggara = "the carpenter"), and who came from Nerash or Nerus (נרשאה) in Babylonia. It is said that Rav Huna once passed the door of R. Abin and, when seeing the house lit by Shabbat candles, remarked that "Two great men will issue hence", since it is stated that "He who habitually practises [the lighting of] the lamp will possess scholarly sons". Indeed, he then had two scholarly sons: Idi and Hiyya b. Abin Naggara.

Idi married a woman of Kohen descent and thus ate the foreleg, cheeks and maw. His sons Shesheth and Shisha were ordained to teach.

Idi acquired his Torah knowledge from Rav Amram and Rav Chisda. He also delivered papers in the name of R. Isaac b. Ashian, most of them in the Aggadah, and most likely he was also his pupil. Idi gave an explanation in the presence of Rav Yosef, had discussions with Abaye on various occasions, and likewise gave explanations in the presence of Rabbah bar Nahmani. He also had occasion to appear in the court of Rav Chisda. His pupils were Rav Pappa and Huna b. Joshua, who were hosted at one of his sons' houses.

Idi was considered the main authority in Nerash, where he introduced a certain law. Idi seems to have moved at a later period to Shekanzib, where he had occasion to receive Pappa and Huna, whom he treated in a somewhat slighting manner.
