= Jeremiah (I) =

R. Jeremiah (Hebrew: רבי ירמיה) was a Tanna sage of the last generation and an Amora sage of the first generation, active in the Land of Israel during the transition period between the Tannaic and Amora sages eras.

The Talmud tells that one of his pupils was a sage called Hezekiah. Rabbi Yehudah be-Rabbi Kalonymus mi-Speyer raises the question whether it was Hezekiah the son of R. Hiyya, or whether it was Hezekiah the son of the daughter of Rav.
