= Papi Zothwane =

South African soccer player

Personal information
- Full name: Papi Joel Zothwane
- Date of birth: 17 August 1981 (age 45)
- Place of birth: Bophelong, South Africa
- Height: 1.90 m (6 ft 3 in)
- Position: Attacking midfielder

Senior career*
Years	Team	Apps	(Gls)
2002–2003	Maritzburg City	21	(3)
2003–2009	Lamontville Golden Arrows	113	(13)
2009–2012	Mamelodi Sundowns	29	(8)
2012	→ Bloemfontein Celtic (loan)	6	(0)
Total		169	(24)

International career
2006–2008	South Africa	8	(0)

Managerial career
- 2021–2022: Uthongathi
- 2022: Polokwane City
- 2022-2024: Uthongathi
- 2024-25: Magesi
- 2026: Sekhukhune United (Assistant)
- 2026-: Sekhukhune United (Manager)
- * Club domestic league appearances and goals

Papi Zothwane (born 17 August 1981 in Bophelong, Gauteng) is a South African former soccer player and manager who currently manages Sekhukhune United

== Personal ==
Zothwane hails from Bophelong, a township near Vanderbijlpark. His younger brother Nhlanhla Zothwane is also a professional footballer.

== Club career ==
Zothwane played for Golden Arrows between 2003 and 2009 having been signed from Maritzburg City. In his first full season with the club, he was voted PSL Club Rookie of the Year.

He was almost signed by Kaizer Chiefs in 2006 but a contractual dispute ended in him staying with Arrows.

Since the end of the 2007–08 season Zothwane had been liked with big money moves to Kaizer Chiefs and Orlando Pirates. After much speculation surrounding his future after the 2008/2009 season, he signed for Mamelodi Sundowns in July 2009 on a three-year contract for an undisclosed fee.

He joined Bloemfontein Celtic on loan in January 2012. He was released by Mamelodi Sundowns at the end of the season.

== International career ==
Having made his international debut in 2006, he was capped eight times by South Africa.

== Coaching career ==
After holding a coaching role at Sobantu Shooting Stars, He returned to Lamontville Golden Arrows at the beginning of the 2016–17 season as coach of their reserve side.

In September 2020, he joined Uthongathi as assistant manager.

In July 2022 he joined Polokwane City

After he parted ways with Polokwane City he rejoined Uthongathi

On Christmas Eve Zothwane was appointed as the interim head coach of Magesi

Zothwane joined Sekhukhune United as assistant coach in July 2026 but later became manager after Cedric Kaze was sacked
