= Levi II =

3rd century Jewish scholar

Levi II, or Rabbi Levi, was a Jewish scholar of the 3rd century (third generation of amoraim). In a few cases he is quoted as Levi bar Laḥma (Hama). In later midrashim the title "Berabbi" is sometimes added to his name.

== Biography ==
He was a contemporary of Zeira and Abba bar Kahana. He quotes halakhic and homiletic teachings by many of his predecessors and contemporaries; but as he quotes most frequently those of Hama bar Hanina, it may be conjectured that he was Hama's pupil, though he probably studied at R. Johanan's academy also. In this academy, he and Judah bar Nahman were alternately engaged to keep the congregation together until Johanan's arrival, and each was paid for his services two "selas" a week.

Once Levi argued that the prophet Jonah was a descendant of the tribe of Zebulun, deducing proof from Scripture. Soon after R. Johanan lectured on the same subject, but argued that Jonah was of the tribe of Asher. The next week being Judah's turn to lecture, Levi took his place and returned to the question of Jonah's descent, proving that both Johanan and himself were right: on his father's side Jonah was descended from Zebulun; on his mother's from Asher. This skillful balancing of their opposing opinions so pleased Johanan that he declared Levi capable of filling an independent lectureship, and for twenty-two years thereafter Levi successfully filled such an office. This incident seems to indicate that Levi's earlier years were spent in poverty. Later, however, he seems to have been wealthier, for he became involved in litigation about some houses and consulted Johanan on the case.

== Aggadic teachings ==
Levi's name but rarely appears in halakhic literature, and then mostly in connection with some Scriptural phrase supporting the dicta of others. In contrast, he is one of the most frequently cited aggadists. He became so famous in aggadah that halakhists like Zeira, who had no special admiration for the aggadist, urged their disciples to frequent Levi's lectures and to listen to them attentively, for "it was impossible that he would ever close a lecture without saying something instructive". In these lectures he would frequently advance different interpretations of a single text, addressing one to scholars and the other to the masses.

Sometimes he would discuss one subject for months in succession. It is reported that for six months he lectured on I Kings 21:25 ("There was none like Ahab, who sold himself to do evil in the sight of the Lord..."). Then he dreamed that Ahab appeared to him and remonstrated with him: "How have I sinned against you and how have I offended you, that you should continually dwell on that part of the verse which refers to my wickedness and disregard the last part, which sets forth the mitigating circumstance—'whom Jezebel his wife instigated'?" Therefore, during the next six months Levi spoke as Ahab's defender, lecturing from the same verse, but omitting the middle clause.

Levi divided all aggadists into two classes: those who can string pearls (i.e., cite fitting texts) but can not perforate them (i.e., penetrate the depths of Scripture), and those who can perforate but can not string them. Of himself, he said that he was skilled in both arts. Once, however, a clear misinterpretation of Levi's so provoked Abba bar Kahana that Abba called him "liar" and "fabricator." But it is authoritatively added that this happened once only. He and Abba were lifelong friends, and Abba showed his admiration for his colleague's exegesis by publicly kissing him.

To render Scriptural terms more intelligible Levi frequently used parallels from cognate languages, especially Arabic. To elucidate his subject he would cite popular proverbs and compose fables and parables. Thus, commenting on Psalms 7:15 (A. V. 14), "He... has conceived mischief, and brought forth falsehood," he says: "The Holy One having ordered Noah to admit into the ark pairs of every species of living beings. Falsehood applied, but Noah refused to admit him unless he brought with him his mate. Falsehood then departed to search for a mate. Meeting Avarice, he inquired, 'From where do you come?' Upon being told that he too had been refused admission into the ark because he had no mate, Falsehood proposed that they present themselves as mates. But Avarice would not agree to this without assurance of material gain; whereupon Falsehood promised him all his earnings, and Avarice repeated the condition agreed upon. After leaving the ark Avarice appropriated all of Falsehood's acquisitions, and when the latter demanded some share of his own, Avarice replied, 'Have we not agreed that all thy earnings shall be mine?' This is the lesson: Falsehood begets falsehood". Levi became known among his contemporaries as the "master of traditional exegesis" (מרא דשמעתא).

=== Quotes ===
- The eye and the heart are two abettors to the crime.
- In three places Satan is prone to rail on a man: He who walks along a road by himself, he who sleeps in a dark house by himself; and he that sets sail in the great sea.
