= Samuel b. Jose b. Boon =

Amora of the sixth generation of the Amora era

Samuel b. Jose b. Boon (or Rabbi Shmuel ben Rabbi Yose beRabbi Boon; Hebrew: רבי שמואל בן רבי יוסי ברבי בון, meaning Rabbi Samuel son of Rabbi Yossi son of Rabbi Boon; variant names: instead of Boon: Abun, Bun, or Avin – as his father was also known as Jose ben Abin) was an Amora of the Land of Israel, of the sixth generation of the Amora era.

During his times, the Jerusalem Talmud was arranged by his father, Jose ben Abin.

He is quoted several times in the Jerusalem Talmud.
