= Rabbi Berekhiah =

Amora of the Land of Israel

R. Berekiah (or R. Berekhyah; Hebrew: רבי ברכיה, read as Rabbi Berekhyah) was an Amora of the Land of Israel, of the fourth generation of the Amora era. He is known for his work on the Aggadah, and there are many of his statements there, and many statements he delivered in the authority of other sages.
