= Hanina bar Papi =

Hanina bar Papi, or Hanina bar Pappai, (Hebrew חנינא בר פפי) was a third generation Jewish Amora sage of the Land of Israel. It is possible that he is the same person as Hanina ben Pappa who is frequently mentioned in Talmudic stories.

== Biography ==
He was among the young students of R. Yochanan bar Nafcha.

His rabbinic peers considered him an example of a righteous man, known to have withstood temptation. They had in mind a story where a certain royal woman urged Hanina into illicit relations with her. In order to deter her, he pronounced a certain magical formula, whereupon his body was covered with boils and scabs, but the woman removed the disease by magic. He fled and hid himself in a bath-house with demons, knowing that the woman would not chase after him to such a place, since it was a place which whoever entered it was would suffer harm. After this his colleagues asked him: Who guarded you? and he replied: Two angels guarded me all night.

His colleagues were R. Abbahu, R. Isaac Nappaha, Rabbi Ammi, and Rav Zeira. Among his pupils were R. Elai and R. Adda b. Abimi.
