= Hiyya b. Abin Naggara =

Rav Hiyya bar Abin Naggara (or Hiyya bar Abin, or Hiyya ben Abin; other uses: instead of "Abin" - "Avin"; Hebrew: רב חייא בר אבין) was a Babylonian rabbi of the fourth generation of amoraim.

He was the son of R. Abin Naggara, who likely worked as a carpenter (Naggara = "the carpenter"), and who came from Nerash or Nerus (נרשאה) in Babylonia. It is said that Rav Huna once passed the door of R. Abin and, when seeing the house lit by Shabbat candles, remarked that "Two great men will issue hence", since it is stated that "He who habitually practises [the lighting of] the lamp will possess scholarly sons". Indeed, he then had two scholarly sons: Idi and Hiyya.

He acquired his Torah knowledge from R. Amram, reported statements in his name, and also studied under Rav Huna and Rav Chisda along with his brother. He also reported statements both in the name of Rav and Samuel of Nehardea. He spent a period of time in the Land of Israel, where he studied Torah under R. Yochanan bar Nafcha. During this period, he heard some teachings of the rabbis of Israel, and later reported them in their name.
