= Terumah (parashah) =

Nineteenth portion in the annual Jewish cycle of weekly Torah reading

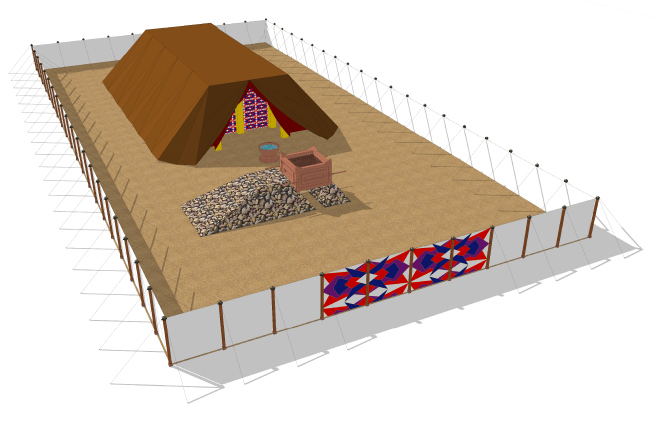
The Tabernacle (2009 SketchUp model by Gabriel Fink)

Terumah, Terumoh, Terimuh, or Trumah (Hebrew: תְּרוּמָה, romanized: Terumā, lit. 'gift, offering', the twelfth word and first distinctive word in the parashah) is the nineteenth weekly Torah portion ('parasha') in the annual Rabbinic Jewish cycle of Torah reading and the seventh in the Book of Exodus. The parasha tells of God's instructions to make the Tabernacle and its furnishings. The parasha constitutes Exodus 25:1–27:19. It is made up of 4,692 Hebrew letters, 1145 Hebrew words, 96 verses, and 155 lines in a Torah scroll. Jews in the Diaspora read it the nineteenth Shabbat after Simchat Torah, generally in February and rarely in early March.

== Readings ==
In traditional Sabbath Torah reading, the parashah is divided into seven readings, or עליות, aliyot.

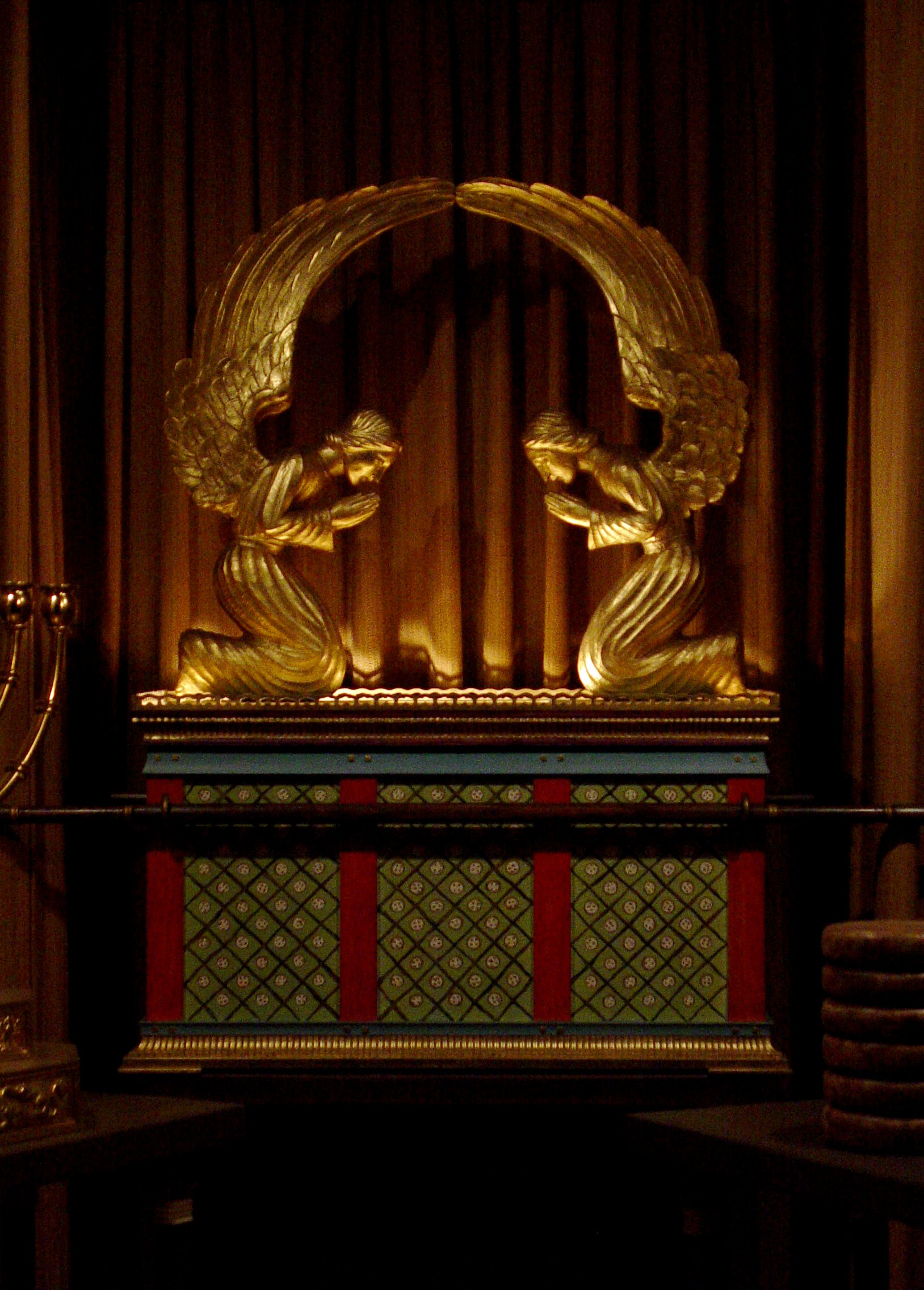
The Ark of the Covenant (replica in George Washington Masonic National Memorial)

=== First reading—Exodus 25:1–16 ===
In the first reading, God instructed Moses to tell all Israelites whose heart so moved them to bring gifts of gold, silver, copper, colored yarns, fine linen, goats' hair, tanned ram skins, acacia wood, oil, spices, lapis lazuli, and other fine stones to make a sanctuary—the Tabernacle (Mishkan, מִּשְׁכָּן)—and its furnishings, so that God could dwell among them. God instructed them to make the Ark of the Covenant of acacia wood overlaid with gold in which to deposit the tablets setting forth God's commandments.

=== Second reading—Exodus 25:17–30 ===
In the second reading, God told them to make two cherubim of gold to be for the ark's cover over the mercy seat. God promised to impart commandments to Moses from between the two cherubim above the cover of the Ark. God instructed them to make a table of acacia wood overlaid with gold, on which to set the bread of display or showbread.

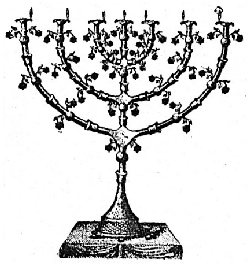
The Golden Lamp or Menorah (from the 1901 A Brief Sketch of the Jewish Tabernacle)

=== Third reading—Exodus 25:31–26:14 ===
In the third reading, God instructed them to make a six-branched, seven-lamped lampstand or menorah of pure gold. God instructed them to make the Tabernacle of ten curtains of fine twisted linen, of blue, purple, and crimson yarns, with a design of cherubim worked into them. God instructed them to make 11 cloths of goats' hair for a tent over the Tabernacle, and coverings of tanned ram and taḥash skins (תְּחָשִׁים, possibly dugong).

=== Fourth reading—Exodus 26:15–30 ===
In the fourth reading, God instructed them to make boards of acacia wood and overlay the boards with gold for the Tabernacle.

=== Fifth reading—Exodus 26:31–37 ===
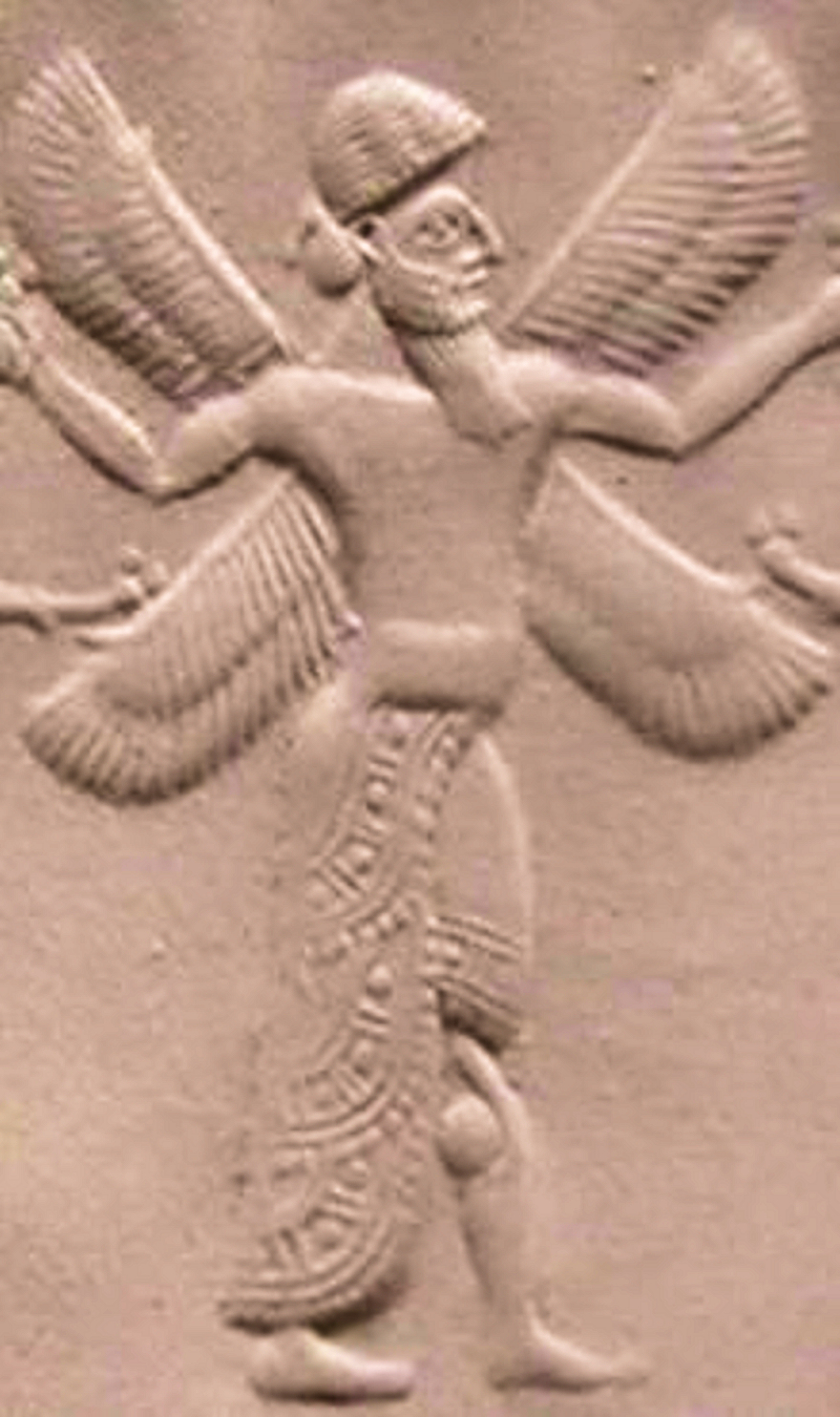
Cherub on a Neo-Assyrian Empire seal, c. 1000–612 BCE

In the fifth reading, God instructed them to make a curtain of blue, purple, and crimson yarns, and fine twisted linen, with a design of cherubim, to serve as a partition obscuring the Holy of Holies. God instructed them to place the Ark, the table, and the menorah in the Tabernacle. God instructed them to make a screen for the entrance of the Tent, made of coloured yarn and fine twisted linen, worked in embroidery, and supported by five posts of acacia wood overlaid with gold.

In Exodus 26:31, God instructed Moses: "You shall make a curtain of blue, purple, and crimson yarns, and fine twisted linen; it shall have a design of cherubim (Biblical Hebrew: כְּרוּבִים, romanized: kərūḇīm worked into it." The Chazal relayed an oral tradition that the sense here is to the work of an artisan skilled in motifs and woven directly onto the fabric from the loom, rather than being embroidered. See also the Babylonian Talmud, Yoma 72b.

=== Sixth reading—Exodus 27:1–8 ===
In the sixth reading, God instructed them to make the altar of acacia wood overlaid with copper.

=== Seventh reading—Exodus 27:9–19 ===
In the seventh reading, God instructed them to make the enclosure of the Tabernacle from fine twisted linen.

=== Readings according to the triennial cycle ===
Jews who read the Torah according to the triennial cycle of Torah reading read the parashah according to the following schedule:

| | Year 1 | Year 2 | Year 3 |
| | 2023, 2026, 2029 . . . | 2024, 2027, 2030 . . . | 2025, 2028, 2031 . . . |
| Reading | 25:1–40 | 26:1–30 | 26:31–27:19 |
|---|---|---|---|
| 1 | 25:1–5 | 26:1–3 | 26:31–33 |
| 2 | 25:6–9 | 26:4–6 | 26:34–37 |
| 3 | 25:10–16 | 26:7–11 | 27:1–3 |
| 4 | 25:17–22 | 26:12–14 | 27:4–8 |
| 5 | 25:23–30 | 26:15–21 | 27:9–12 |
| 6 | 25:31–33 | 26:22–25 | 27:13–16 |
| 7 | 25:34–40 | 26:26–30 | 27:17–19 |
| Maftir | 25:37–40 | 26:26–30 | 27:17–19 |

== Inner-biblical interpretation ==
The parashah has parallels or is discussed in these Biblical sources:

This is the pattern of instruction and construction of the Tabernacle and its furnishings:

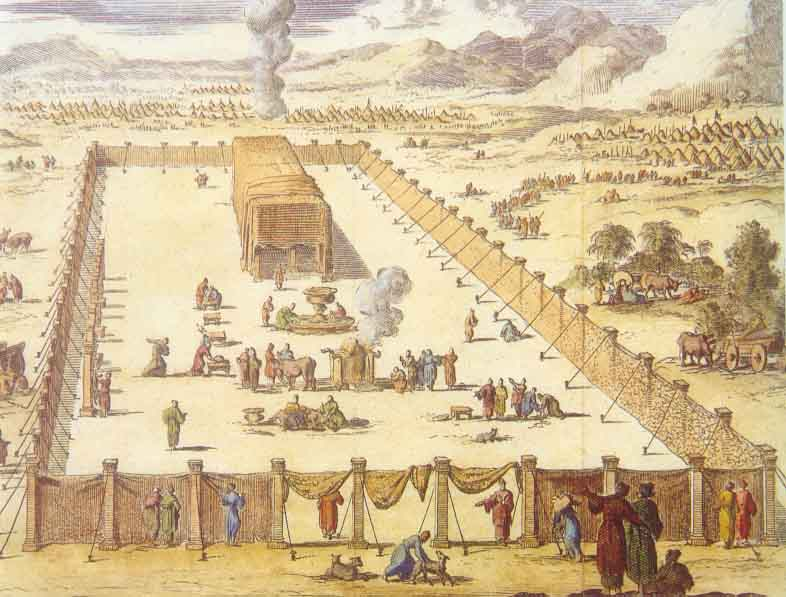
The Tabernacle

The Priestly story of the Tabernacle in Exodus 25–27 echoes the Priestly story of creation in Genesis 1:1–2:3. As the creation story unfolds in seven days, the instructions about the Tabernacle unfold in seven speeches. In both creation and Tabernacle accounts, the text notes the completion of the task. In both creation and Tabernacle, the work done is seen to be good. In both creation and Tabernacle, when the work is finished, God takes an action in acknowledgement. In both creation and Tabernacle, when the work is finished, a blessing is invoked. And in both creation and Tabernacle, God declares something "holy."

Jeffrey Tigay noted that the lampstand held seven candles, Aaron wore seven sacral vestments, the account of the building of the Tabernacle alludes to the creation account, and the Tabernacle was completed on New Year's Day. And Carol Meyers noted that Exodus 25:1–9 and 35:4–29 list seven kinds of substances—metals, yarn, skins, wood, oil, spices, and gemstones—signifying the totality of supplies. Martin Buber and others noted that the language used to describe the building of the Tabernacle parallels that used in the story of creation:

Creation and the Tabernacle
| Verses in Genesis | Texts | Words in Common | Verses in Exodus | Texts |
|---|---|---|---|---|
| 1:7, 16, 25 | ^{7}And God made (וַיַּעַשׂ) the firmament, and divided the waters which were under the firmament from the waters which were above the firmament; and it was so. ... ^{16}And God made (וַיַּעַשׂ) the two great lights: the greater light to rule the day, and the lesser light to rule the night; and the stars. ... ^{25}And God made (וַיַּעַשׂ) the beast of the earth after its kind, and the cattle after their kind, and everything that creeps upon the ground after its kind; and God saw that it was good. | made make וַיַּעַשׂ וְעָשׂוּ וְעָשִׂיתָ | 25:8, 10, 23, 31] | ^{8}And let them make (וְעָשׂוּ) Me a sanctuary, that I may dwell among them. . . . ^{10}And they shall make (וְעָשׂוּ) an ark of acacia-wood: two cubits and a half shall be the length thereof, and a cubit and a half the breadth thereof, and a cubit and a half the height thereof. . . . ^{23}And you shall make (וְעָשִׂיתָ) a table of acacia-wood: two cubits shall be the length thereof, and a cubit the breadth thereof, and a cubit and a half the height thereof. ... ^{31}And you shall make (וְעָשִׂיתָ) a menorah of pure gold: of beaten work shall the menorah be made, even its base, and its shaft; its cups, its knops, and its flowers, shall be of one piece with it. |
| 2:1–2 | ^{1}And the heaven and the earth were finished (וַיְכֻלּוּ), and all the host of them. ^{2}And on the seventh day God finished (וַיְכַל) His work that He had made; and He rested on the seventh day from all His work that He had made. | finished וַיְכֻלּוּ וַיְכַל וַתֵּכֶל | 39:32; 40:33 | ^{32}Thus was finished (וַתֵּכֶל) all the work of the Tabernacle of the tent of meeting; and the children of Israel did according to all that the Lord commanded Moses, so did they. ... ^{33}And he reared up the court round about the tabernacle and the altar, and set up the screen of the gate of the court. So Moses finished (וַיְכַל) the work. |
| 1:31 | ^{31}And God saw (וַיַּרְא) everything that He had made, and, behold (וְהִנֵּה), it was very good. And there was evening and there was morning, the sixth day. | saw . . . behold וַיַּרְא . . . וְהִנֵּה | 39:43 | ^{43}And Moses saw (וַיַּרְא) all the work, and, behold (וְהִנֵּה), they had done it; as the Lord had commanded, even so had they done it. And Moses blessed them. |
| 2:3 | ^{3}And God blessed (וַיְבָרֶךְ) the seventh day, and hallowed it; because in it He rested from all His work that God in creating had made. | blessed וַיְבָרֶךְ | 39:43 | ^{43}And Moses saw all the work, and, behold, they had done it; as the Lord had commanded, even so had they done it. And Moses blessed (וַיְבָרֶךְ) them. |

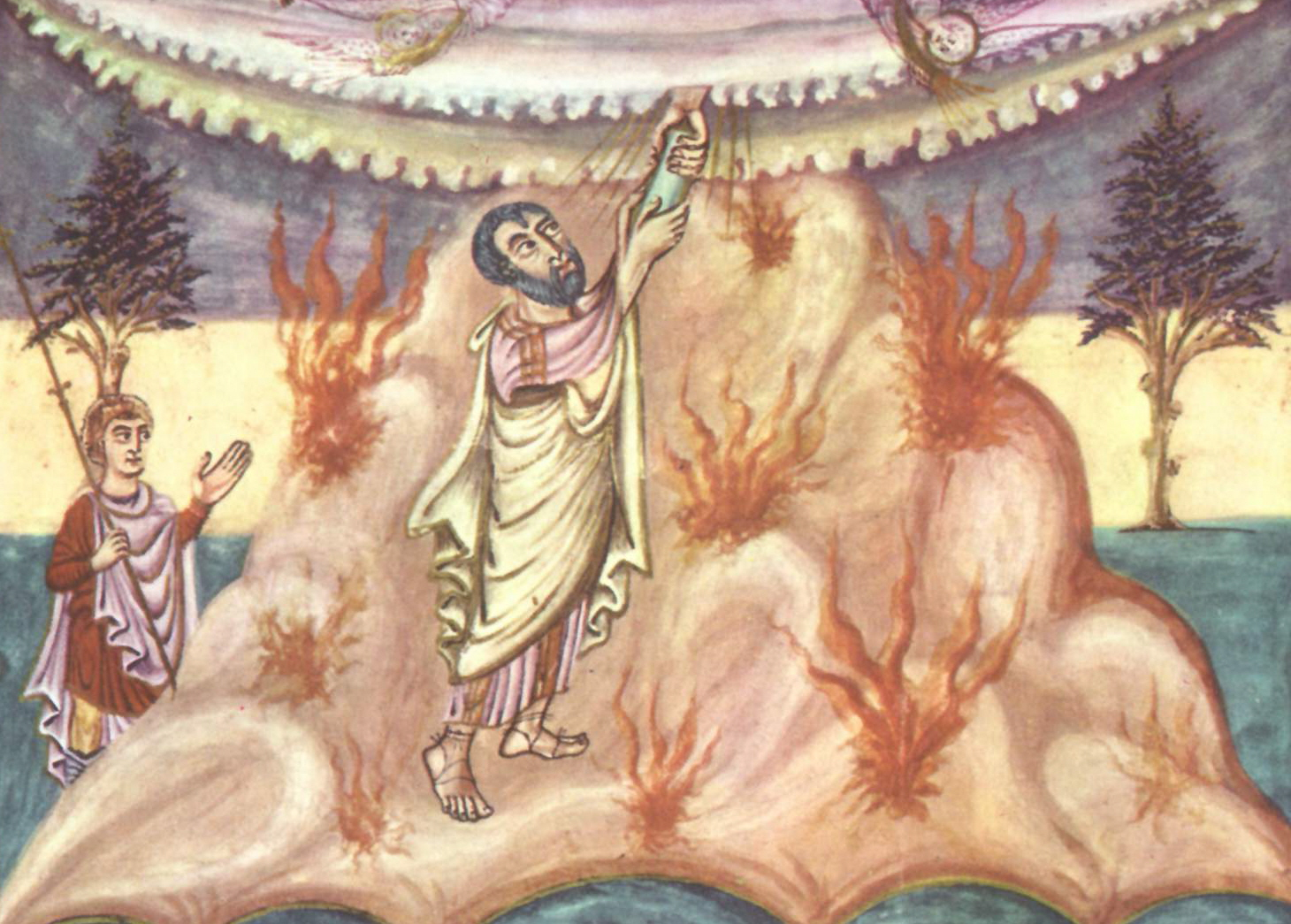
Moses Receives the Law (illustration by a Carolingian book illuminator circa 840)

The Tabernacle also exhibited similarities with Mount Sinai. Both Mount Sinai and the Tabernacle had three separate areas with increasing levels of exclusivity—one for the people generally, one for the anointed class, and one for only the single representative of the people; the tablets of the law a cloud; and God's presence. And God spoke to Moses at both Mount Sinai and the Tabernacle. But in contrast to Mount Sinai, with the Tabernacle God's presence was constant; God's presence was in their midst, no longer distant; and God's presence was no longer rooted to a fixed place.

God's request for "willing" gifts in Exodus 25:2 is echoed in the accounts of gifts given "willingly" in 1 Chronicles 29:9 in the time of David and in Ezra 2:68 for the Second Temple.

== In early nonrabbinic interpretation ==
The parashah is discussed in these early nonrabbinic sources:

Josephus interpreted the Tabernacle and its furnishings to represent the universe. He saw the Tabernacle's two parts accessible to the priests (the Holy and the Courtyard) to denote the land and the sea, the third division set aside for God (the Holy of Holies) to represent heaven, inaccessible to people. He saw the 12 loaves to denote the year divided into months. He saw the Menorah divided into 70 parts, representing the 70 divisions of the planets, and the seven lamps on the Menorah to refer to the course of the seven planets (then known). He saw the veils, composed of four things, to declare the four elements: the fine linen signified the earth, because the flax grows out of the earth; the purple signified the sea, because purple was dyed by the blood of shellfish from the sea; the blue signified the air; and the scarlet signified fire.

Philo taught that the two cherubim in Exodus 25:18–22 represented God's two primary powers—(1) God's beneficent power, in accordance with which God made the world, and in respect of which God is called "God," and (2) God's chastening power, according to which God rules and governs what God has created, and in respect of which God is called "Lord." Philo read Exodus 25:22 to teach that God's two powers were divided in the middle by God standing above them both. And Exodus 25:22 reports that God would speak to the Israelites from between the two cherubim to show that the two powers are equal, God's beneficent and chastising powers being divided by the same Word.

== In classical rabbinic interpretation ==
The parashah is discussed in these rabbinic sources from the era of the Mishnah and the Talmud:

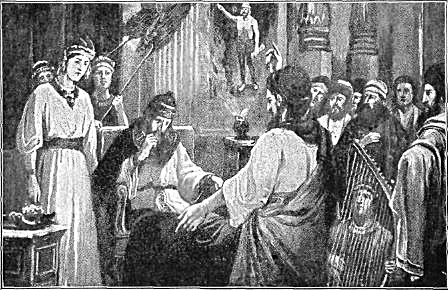
Daniel interpreting Nebuchadnezzar's dream in Daniel 2:32 (illustration from the 1917 book Our Day in the Light of Prophecy)

=== Exodus chapter 25 ===
A Midrash read Exodus 25:2 to say "that they take Me as an offering" and thus to tell how God gave the Torah to Israel and said to them: "You are taking Me."

Reading God's words in Exodus 25:2, "accept gifts for Me from every person whose heart so moves him," the Mekhilta of Rabbi Simeon deduced that each and every Israelite was so rich from having stripped the Egyptians (as reported in Exodus 12:36) that each Israelite had the wherewithal to erect the Tent of Meeting, with all its vessels, all of its golden hooks, boards, wooden bars, columns, and pedestals.

A Midrash taught that Exodus 25:3 calls for offerings of gold, silver, and brass for the construction of the Tabernacle, because gold symbolizes Babylon, of which Daniel 2:32 says, "As for that image, its head was of fine gold"; silver symbolizes the Medes, of which Daniel 2:32 says, "Its breast and its arms were of silver"; and brass refers to Greece, of which Daniel 2:32 says, "Its belly and thighs were of brass." But the Bible makes no mention of iron in the construction either of the Tabernacle or of the Temple in Jerusalem, because iron symbolizes Rome, which destroyed the Temple.

The Rabbis taught in a Baraita that the turquoise wool (techeilet, תְכֵלֶת) listed in Exodus 25:4 came from an animal called a chilazon that resembled the sea in color and a fish in shape, that appeared once every 70 years, and whose blood was used to dye the expensive blue thread.

But what fabric did the blue of Exodus 25:4 dye? The school of Rabbi Ishmael taught that all unspecified garments mentioned in the Torah are of wool or linen.

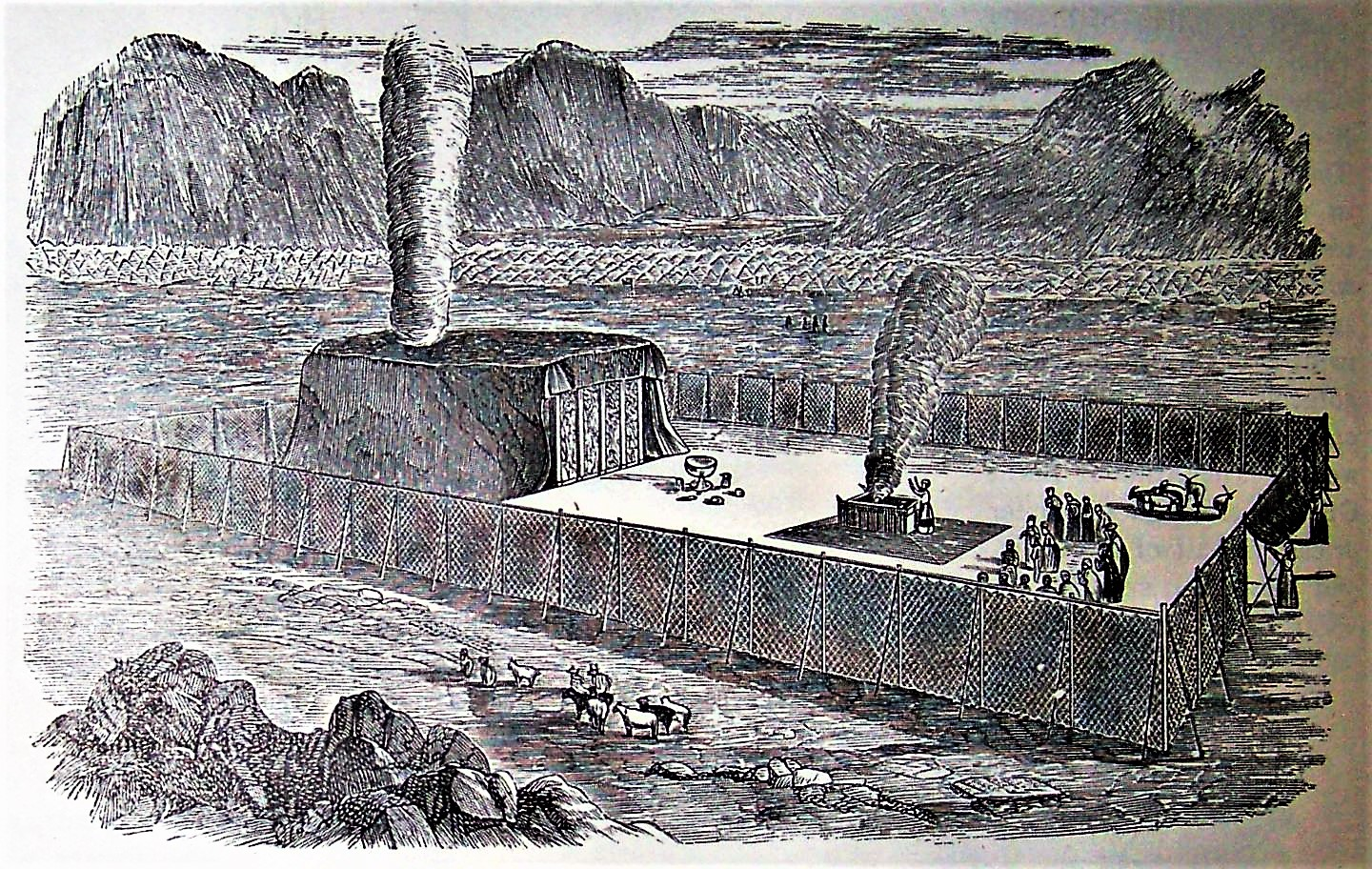
The Tabernacle (illustration from the 1890 Holman Bible)

Rabbi Elai said in the name of Rabbi Simeon ben Lakish (Resh Lakish) that Rabbi Meir used to maintain that the תְּחָשִׁים, techashim (sometimes translated "sealskins" or "dolphin skins") listed in Exodus 25:5 came from an animal called a tachash that lived in the time of Moses. It was a separate species, and the Sages could not decide whether it was a wild beast or a domestic animal. It had one horn on its forehead, and it came to Moses providentially just for the occasion. Moses made the Tabernacle's covering, and then the tachash disappeared. The Gemara taught that the tachash was multicolored.

The Tosefta deduced from Exodus 25:5 (and the principle that the law prohibits doing on the Sabbath all that was done to build the Tabernacle) that one who tans hides on the Sabbath violates the commandment to keep the Sabbath.

The Tosefta taught that invalidity of either the onyx stones or the stones to be set described in Exodus 25:7 invalidated the other.

The Tosefta taught that Exodus 25:8 provided the commandment that Exodus 39:43 said that Moses fulfilled.

A Midrash explained with a parable God's instruction to build a Tabernacle. A king had only one daughter, who married another king. When the son-in-law king wished to return to his country and take his wife with him, the father king told him that he could neither part with his daughter nor tell her husband not to take her, as she was now his wife. The father king thus asked the son-in-law king the favor that wherever the son-in-law king would go to live, he would have a chamber ready for the father king to dwell with them, for he could not bear to leave his daughter. Thus, God told Israel that God had given Israel a Torah from which God could not part, and yet God also could not tell Israel not to take the Torah. Thus, God asked the Israelites to make for God a house wherein God might sojourn wherever the Israelites went, and thus Exodus 25:8 says, "And let them make Me a sanctuary, that I may dwell among them."

Rabbi Eleazar ben Azariah taught that the words of Exodus 25:8, "And let them make Me a sanctuary, that I may dwell among them," demonstrate that so great is labor that God's Presence did not dwell among the Israelites until they had performed the labor of making the sanctuary.

The Mekhilta of Rabbi Ishmael asked why in Exodus 25:8 God commanded, "Let them make Me a sanctuary that I may dwell among them," when in Isaiah 66:1, God said, "The heaven is My throne, and the earth is My footstool; where is the house that you may build for Me?" The Mekhilta of Rabbi Ishmael taught that the purport of the commandment was simply to enable the Israelites to receive a reward for fulfilling it.

The Babylonian Talmud related a story about God's desire for the Tabernacle. Rabbi Judah ha-Nasi arranged for his son to marry a daughter of the household of Rabbi Yosei ben Zimra. The two Rabbis agreed that they would support the groom for twelve years to go to study in the study hall. It was assumed that he would first go to study and then get married. But when the groom saw the bride to be, he asked that they shorten the delay to just six years. When he saw her again, he said that he wanted to marry her immediately and then go to study. He was then ashamed to see his father, as he thought Rabbi Judah would reprimand him for his impatience. His father placated him and told him that he had his Maker's perception, meaning that he acted the same way as God did. For initially, the words of Exodus 15:17, "You bring them and plant them in the mountain of Your inheritance, the place that You, O Lord, have made for You to dwell in," indicated that God’s original intention was to build a Temple for the Jewish people after they had entered the Land of Israel. But then in Exodus 25:8, God directed, "And let them make Me a Sanctuary, that I may dwell among them," that is, even while they were still in the desert, indicating that due to their closeness to God, the Israelites enjoyed greater affection from God and God therefore advanced what would originally have come later.

Abba Ḥanan in the name of Rabbi Elazar noted that Deuteronomy 10:1 says, "And make you an ark of wood," indicating that it should be from your own property, while Exodus 25:10 says, "And they shall make an ark of acacia wood," meaning from the Jewish people. The Gemara resolved this apparent contradiction by teaching that Exodus 25:10 refers to a time when the Jewish people did God's will, and they are credited with building the Ark of the Covenant. Deuteronomy 10:1, however, refers to a time when the Jewish people do not do God's will, and making the Ark is attributed to Moses alone. Thus, when Israel acts according to the Torah, they are accounted as makers of the Ark, but when they do not, the Ark is seen as the product of Moses alone.

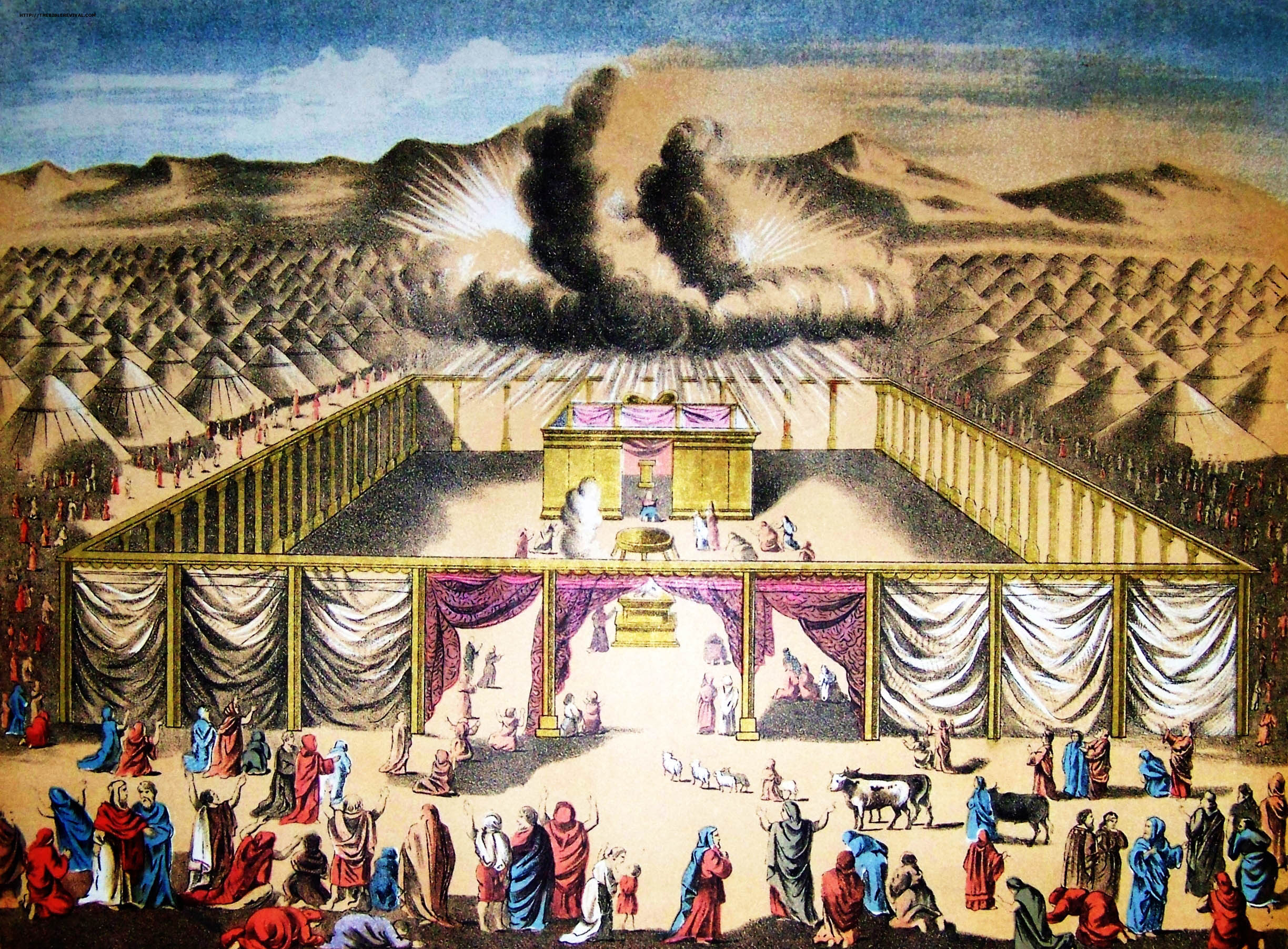
The Tabernacle in the Wilderness (illustration from the 1890 Holman Bible)

A Midrash taught that everything God created in heaven has a replica on earth. And the Midrash taught that many things in the Tabernacle reflected things in heaven. Thus, Isaiah 37:16 reports that there are cherubim in heaven, saying, "O Lord of hosts, the God of Israel, Who sits between the cherubim." While below on earth, Exodus 25:18–20 directs the Israelites to fashion two cherubim of gold to spread their wings to cover the Ark. Of heaven, Psalm 104:2 reports that God "stretches out the heavens like a curtain." While of earth, Exodus 26:1 directs the Israelites to create "ten curtains" for the Tabernacle. Of heaven, Isaiah 6:2 reports, "Above [God] stood the seraphim." While on earth, Exodus 26:15 directs the Israelites to "make the boards for the Tabernacle of acacia-wood, standing up." (Thus, the standing boards of acacia wood correspond to the standing seraphim.) Of heaven, Genesis 1:6 reports God's command, "Let there be a firmament in the midst of the waters, and let it divide the waters from the waters." While on earth, Exodus 26:33 directs the Israelites that "the veil shall divide between the holy place and the most holy." Of heaven, Daniel 2:22 reports, "And the light dwells with [God]." While on earth, Exodus 27:20 directs, "That they bring to you pure olive-oil beaten for the light." (Thus, since all that is above is also below, God dwells on earth just as God dwells in heaven.) And what is more, the Midrash taught that God holds the things below on earth dearer than those above, for as Exodus 25:8 reports, God left the things in heaven to descend to dwell among those below, saying, "And let them make Me a sanctuary, that I may dwell among them."

The Mekhilta of Rabbi Ishmael taught that Exodus 35:1–3 sets forth laws of Sabbath observance where it does because in Exodus 25:8 God directed, "And let them make Me a sanctuary," and one might have understood that they could build the sanctuary both on weekdays and the Sabbath. The Mekhilta of Rabbi Ishmael taught that God's direction in Exodus 25:8 to "make Me a sanctuary" applied on all days other than the Sabbath. The Mekhilta of Rabbi Ishmael posited that one might argue that since the Temple service occurs even on the Sabbath, then perhaps the preparation for the service, without which the priests could not perform the service, could occur even on the Sabbath. One might conclude that if the horn of the altar broke off or a knife became defective, one might repair them on the Sabbath. Exodus 35:1–3 teaches, however, that even such work must be done only on weekdays, and not on the Sabbath.

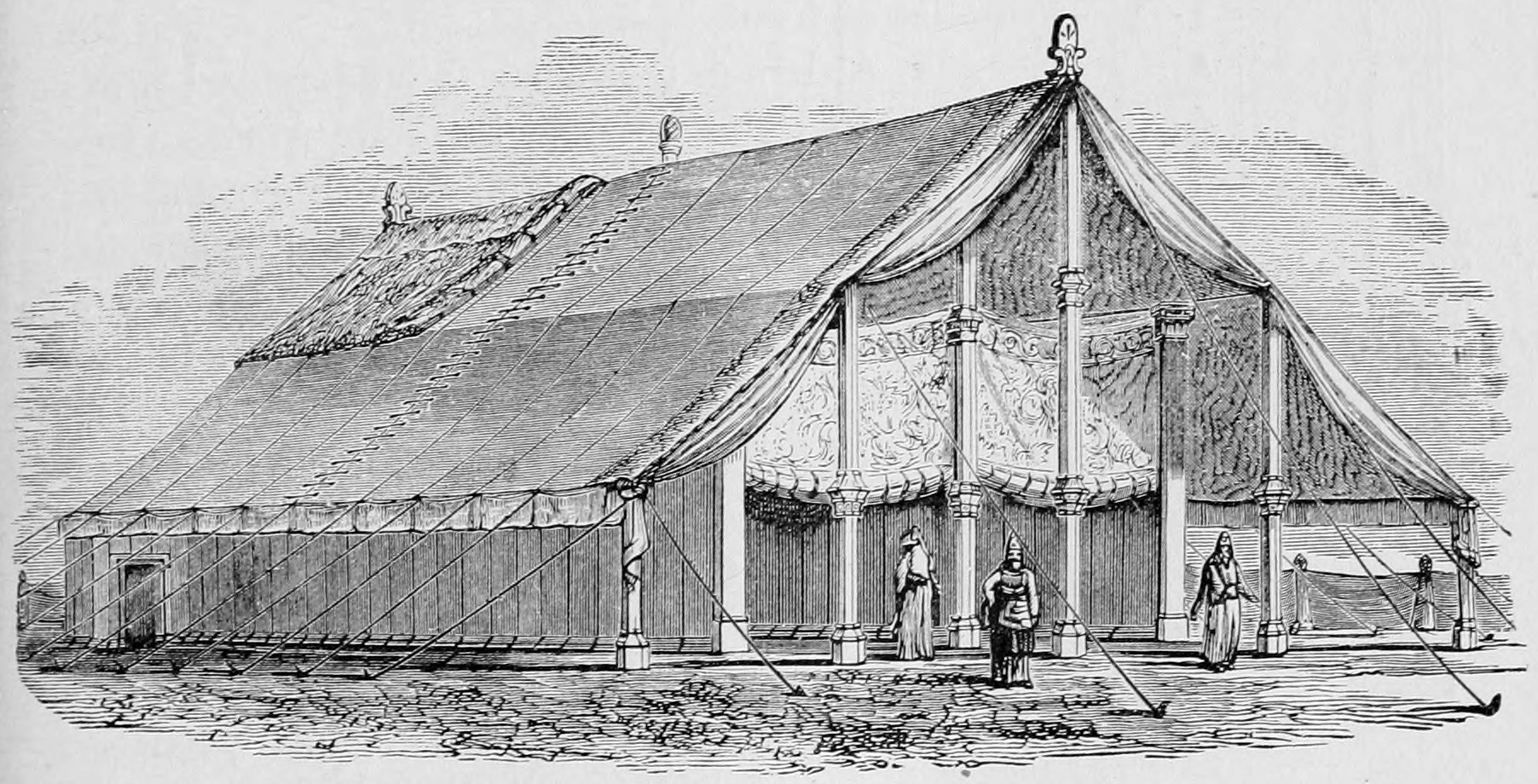
Southeast view of the Tabernacle (1887 illustration by James Fergusson)

Rabbi Simeon son of Rabbi Ishmael interpreted the term "the Tabernacle of the testimony" in Exodus 38:21 to mean that the Tabernacle was God's testimony to the whole world that God had forgiven Israel for having made the Golden Calf. Rabbi Isaac explained with a parable. A king took a wife whom he dearly loved. He became angry with her and left her, and her neighbors taunted her, saying that he would not return. Then the king sent her a message asking her to prepare the king's palace and make the beds therein, for he was coming back to her on such-and-such a day. On that day, the king returned to her and became reconciled to her, entering her chamber and eating and drinking with her. Her neighbors at first did not believe it, but when they smelled the fragrant spices, they knew that the king had returned. Similarly, God loved Israel, bringing the Israelites to Mount Sinai, and giving them the Torah, but after only 40 days, they sinned with the Golden Calf. The heathen nations then said that God would not be reconciled with the Israelites. But when Moses pleaded for mercy on their behalf, God forgave them, as Numbers 14:20 reports, "And the Lord said: ‘I have pardoned according to your word.'" Moses then told God that even though he personally was quite satisfied that God had forgiven Israel, he asked that God might announce that fact to the nations. God replied that God would cause God's Shechinah to dwell in their midst, and thus Exodus 25:8 says, "And let them make Me a sanctuary, that I may dwell among them." And by that sign, God intended that all nations might know that God had forgiven the Israelites. And thus Exodus 38:21 calls it "the Tabernacle of the testimony," because the Tabernacle was a testimony that God had pardoned the Israelites' sins.

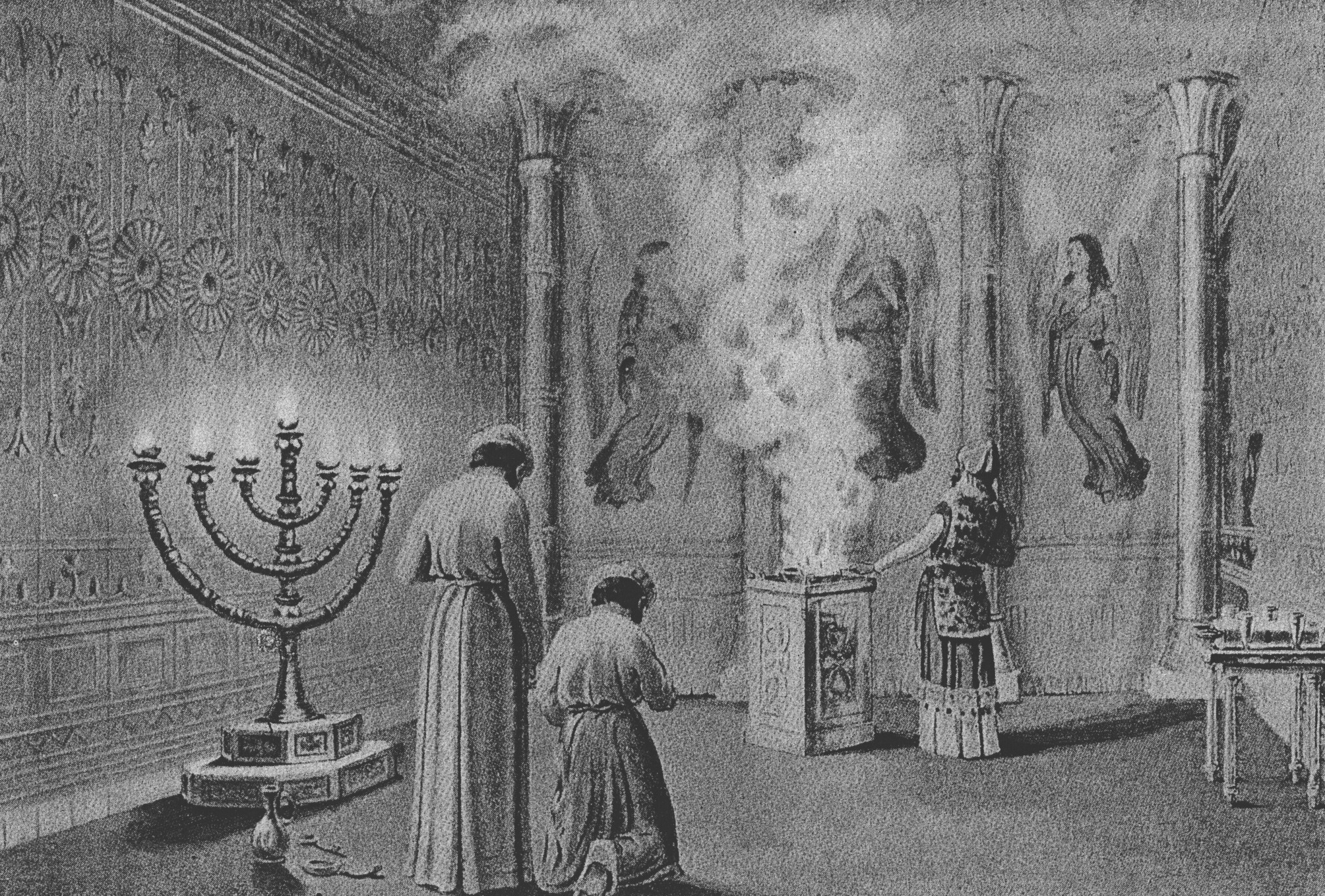
The Shekinah Glory Enters the Tabernacle (illustration from the 1908 Bible and Its Story Taught by One Thousand Picture Lessons)

A Midrash told that when God told Moses to make a tabernacle for God (in Exodus 25:8), Moses questioned how God could command Moses make a tabernacle for God, if God's Glory fills heaven and earth. And Moses saw prophetically that Solomon would one day build a Temple, much larger than the Tabernacle, and yet (in 1 Kings 8:27) Solomon would say to God, "But will God in truth dwell on the earth? Behold, heaven and the heaven of heavens cannot contain You; how much less this house that I have built!" God replied that God does not think as humans think. Twenty boards on the north, twenty on the south, and eight in the west can suffice. God could even confine God's Shechinah within one square cubit.

Rav Assi of Hozna'ah deduced from the words, "And it came to pass in the first month of the second year, on the first day of the month," in Exodus 40:17 that the Tabernacle was erected on the first of Nisan. With reference to this, a Tanna taught that the first of Nisan took ten crowns of distinction by virtue of the ten momentous events that occurred on that day. The first of Nisan was: (1) the first day of the Creation, (2) the first day of the princes' offerings, (3) the first day for the priesthood to make the sacrificial offerings, (4) the first day for public sacrifice, (5) the first day for the descent of fire from Heaven, (6) the first for the priests' eating of sacred food in the sacred area, (7) the first for the dwelling of the Shechinah in Israel, (8) the first for the Priestly Blessing of Israel, (9) the first for the prohibition of the high places, and (10) the first of the months of the year.

A Baraita further compared the day that the Israelites dedicated the Tabernacle with the day that God created the universe. Reading the words of Leviticus 9:1, "And it came to pass on the eighth day," the Baraita taught that on that day (when the Israelites dedicated the Tabernacle) there was joy before God as on the day when God created heaven and earth. For Leviticus 9:1 says, "And it came to pass (וַיְהִי, va-yehi) on the eighth day," and Genesis 1:5 says, "And there was (וַיְהִי, va-yehi) one day." And Rav Judah taught in the name of Rav that God endowed the Tabernacle's craftsman Bezalel with the same attribute that God used in creating the universe. Rav Judah said in the name of Rav that Bezalel knew how to combine the letters by which God created the heavens and earth. For Exodus 35:31 says (about Bezalel), "And He has filled him with the spirit of God, in wisdom and in understanding, and in knowledge," and Proverbs 3:19 says (about creation), "The Lord by wisdom founded the earth; by understanding He established the heavens," and Proverbs 3:20 says, "By His knowledge the depths were broken up."

The Gemara deduced from Exodus 25:8, "And let them make Me a sanctuary, that I may dwell among them," that the Tabernacle was called "Sanctuary." And the Gemara deduced that the Sanctuary (that is, the Temple in Jerusalem) was called "Tabernacle" from Leviticus 26:11, "And I will set my Tabernacle among you" (as this was said after the Israelites had already erected the Tabernacle in the wilderness). Thus the Gemara concluded that Scripture calls the Tabernacle "Sanctuary" and the Sanctuary (that is, the Temple) "Tabernacle," and one may thus draw analogies between the two.

Reading Exodus 25:9, "According to all that I show you, the pattern of the Tabernacle . . . even so shall you make it," Rav Shimi bar Hiyya deduced that just as the Tabernacle required the consent of Moses, so additions to the Temple or the City of Jerusalem required the consent of the Sanhedrin (the heir to the authority of Moses). (The phrase, "so shall you make it," is superfluous, because Exodus 25:8 already said, "Let them make Me a sanctuary." So Rav Shimi read the superfluous phrase to imply that whatever was done for the Tabernacle in the wilderness should be done for any future Temple or Temple city, as well.)

Interpreting the words, "And they shall make an Ark," in Exodus 25:10, Rabbi Judah ben Rabbi Shalom taught that God said that all should come and occupy themselves with the Ark so that they all might merit the Torah. Rabbi Simeon taught that there are three crowns—the crown of Torah, the crown of priesthood, and the crown of royalty; but the crown of a good name surpasses them all. The table is the crown of kingship, of which Exodus 25:24 says, "And make thereto a crown of gold round about." The altar is the crown of priesthood, of which Exodus 30:3 says, "And you shall make unto it a crown of gold round about." And the Ark is the crown of the Torah, of which Exodus 25:11 says, "And you shall make upon it a crown of gold round about." The word for "crown" (zer, זֵר) can also be read as zar (stranger), to teach that if a person has merit, it becomes like a crown, but if a person does not have merit, then it becomes alien to that person. Of the other furnishings, Scripture says, "And you shall make," whereas of the Ark, Exodus 25:10 says, "And they shall make," to teach that the crown of the Torah stands above all; when a person acquires the Torah, it is as though that person has acquired all the rest.

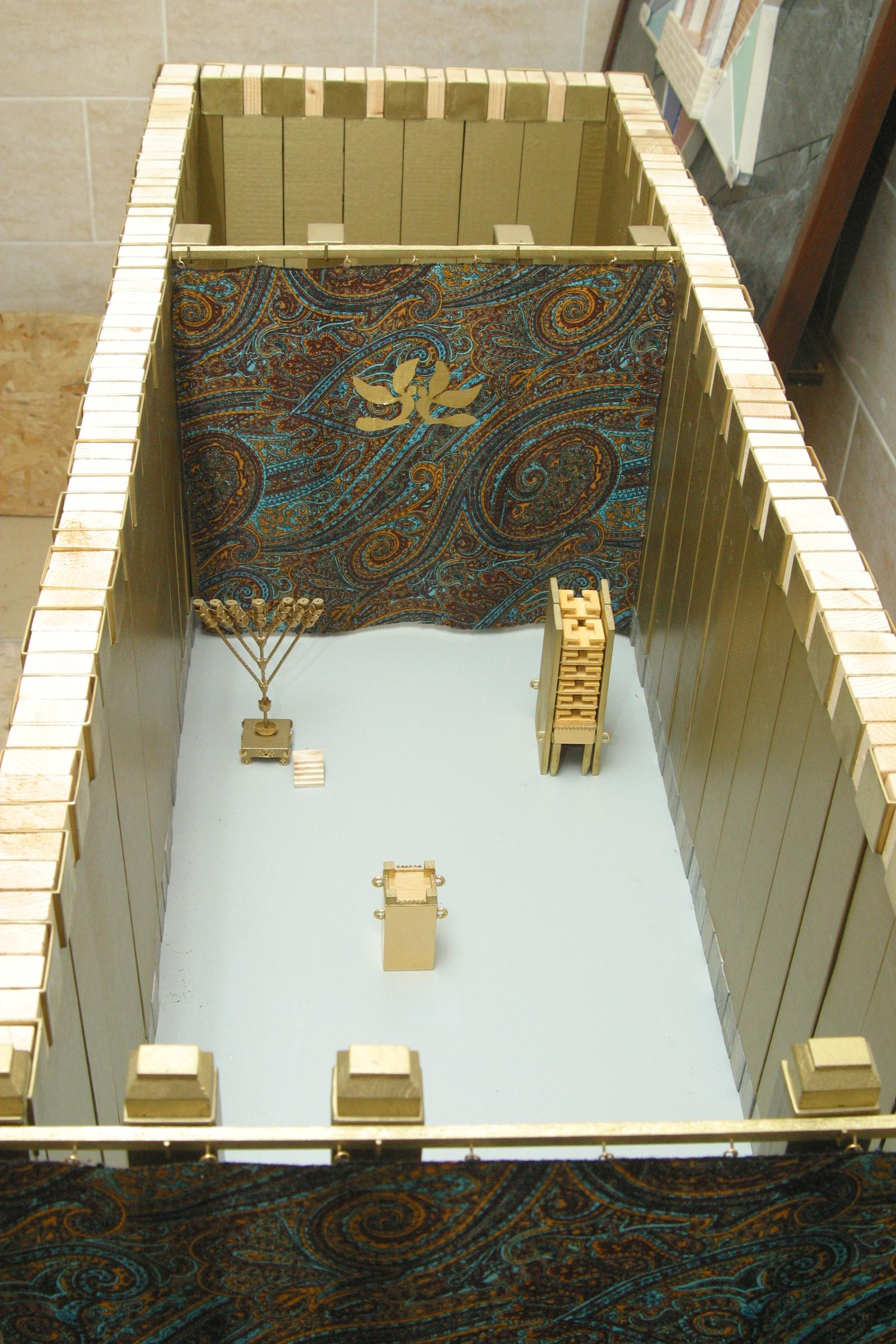
The Holy place, and behind it the Holy of Holies (model circa 2007)

Once when Rabbi Hanina went out to the country, some villagers noted an apparent contradiction between two verses. 1 Kings 6:2 says: "And the house which King Solomon built for the Lord, the length thereof was 60 cubits, and the breadth thereof 20 cubits, and the height thereof 30 cubits." And 1 Kings 6:20 says: "And before the Sanctuary which was 20 cubits in length, and 20 cubits in breadth, and 20 cubits in the height thereof." Rabbi Hanina replied that 1 Kings 6:20 accounts for the space from the edge of the Cherubim upwards. The Gemara deduced that 1 Kings 6:20 thus teaches that the 10 cubits of space below (from the floor to the top of the Cherubim) was like the 20 cubits of space above (the Cherubim) in that neither space served any material purpose. (Both spaces were devoid of any structure.) This supports Rabbi Levi (or others say Rabbi Johanan), who said it is a tradition passed down from our fathers that the place of the Ark and the Cherubim is not included in the measured space (and miraculously they occupied none of the space of the Sanctuary). So, as well, it was taught in a Baraita that the Ark that Moses made had a free space of 10 cubits on every side (and miraculously occupied none of the space of the Holy of Holies in the Tabernacle). Ravina said in the name of Samuel that the Cherubim made by Solomon stood by a miracle (and took up no space), for 1 Kings 6:24 says, "And five cubits was the one wing of the cherub, and five cubits the other wing of the cherub; from the uttermost part of the one wing unto the uttermost part of the other were ten cubits." (The two Cherubim would thus have filled up the entire 20 cubits of the Sanctuary.) As the Sanctuary thus left no room for their bodies to stand, the Gemara inferred that they stood by a miracle. Abaye demurred that they might have been standing with their bodies under their wings like hens (whose wings touch each other on their backs, leaving their entire bodies covered by their wings). Rava demurred that perhaps they did not stand opposite each another (and thus their wings overlapped). Rav Aha bar Jacob demurred that they might have stood diagonally. Rav Huna the son of Rav Joshua demurred that the house might have been wider above than below. Rav Papa demurred that their wings might have been bent. Rav Ashi demurred that their wings might have overlapped each other.

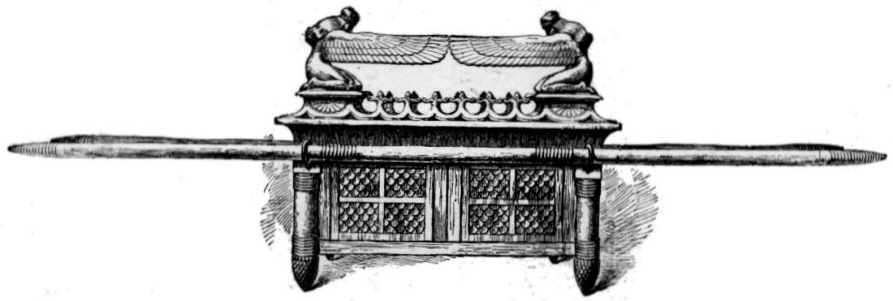
The Ark of the Covenant (drawing circa 1896–1902 by James Tissot)

Noting that Exodus 25:11 says, "You shall overlay it with pure gold, within and without," Rava interpreted that any scholar whose inside is not like the outside is no scholar. (A scholar thus should have the same golden character inside and out.)

The Mishnah described how on Yom Kippur the High Priest (כֹּהֵן גָּדוֹל, Kohen Gadol) would place a fire pan between the two bars of the Ark of the Covenant described in Exodus 25:12.

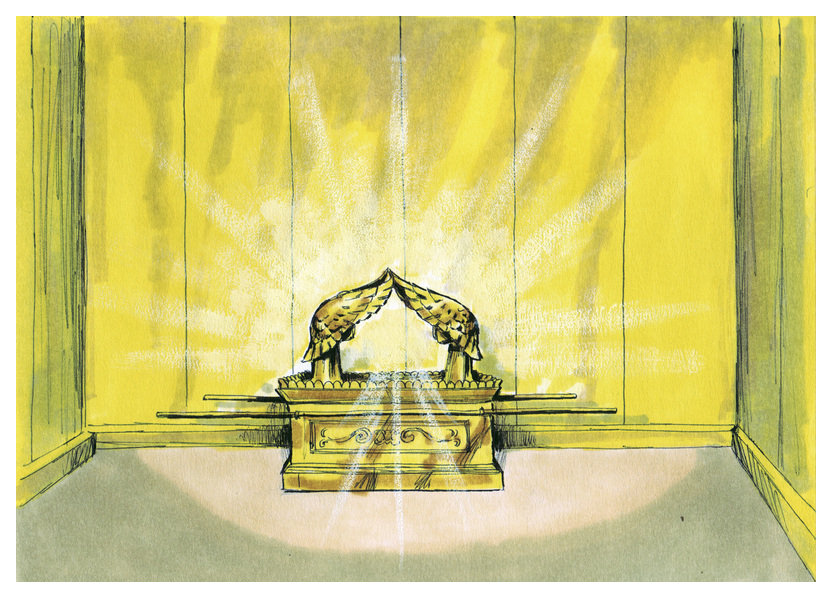
On top of the Covenant Box were two angels. (1984 illustration by Jim Padgett, courtesy of Distant Shores Media/Sweet Publishing)

Rabbi Abbahu taught that a cherub (as in Exodus 25:18) had a face like a child (keravya), for in Babylonia they called a child ravya. Rav Papa asked Abaye that if this is so, then there is a difficulty interpreting Ezekiel 10:14, which says of Ezekiel's vision, "the first face was the face of the cherub, and the second face was the face of a man, and the third the face of a lion, and the fourth the face of an eagle." Would not the face of the cherub and the face of a man be the same? The Gemara answered that one was a big face, and the other was a small face.

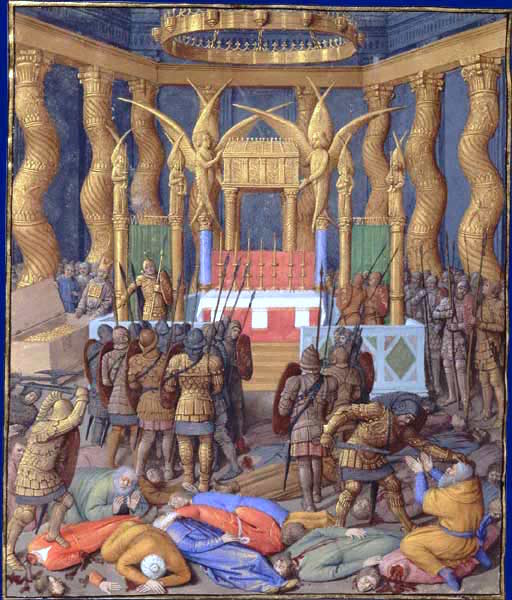
Pompey in the Temple of Jerusalem (1470 painting by Jean Fouquet)

Rabbi Johanan and Rabbi Eleazar differed on how the Cherubim stood. One said that they faced each other, and the other said they faced inward (toward the door). The Gemara asked how one could reconcile the view that they faced each other with 2 Chronicles 3:13, which says, "And their faces were inward." The Gemara explained that they faced each other (in a sign of affection, symbolizing the relationship between God and the people) when Israel obeyed God's will of God; they faced inward (away from each other, symbolizing God's unrequited love for Israel) when Israel did not obey God's will. The Gemara asked how one could reconcile the view that they faced inward with Exodus 25:20, which says, "With their faces one to another." The Gemara explained that they were slightly turned sideways (partly facing each other and partly facing inward). As it was taught in a Baraita, Onkelos the proselyte said that the Cherubim were formed like children (as some read 2 Chronicles 3:10) and their faces were turned sideways, like those of a student who takes leave of the student's master (turning sideways for some distance before turning the student's back completely on the master).

Rav Kattina said that whenever the Israelites came up to the Temple on a Festival, the priests would pull back the curtain and show them the Cherubim, whose bodies were intertwined with one another (in an embrace). And the priests would tell the people that they were as beloved by God as the love between a man and a woman. Rav Aha bar Jacob explained that the Second Temple contained painted Cherubim, as 1 Kings 6:29 says: "And he (Solomon) carved all the walls of the house round about with carved figures of Cherubim and palm-trees and open flowers, within and without," and 1 Kings 6:35 says, "he overlaid them with gold fitted upon the graven work." And 1 Kings 7:36 says: "According to the space of each, with loyot (לֹיוֹת, ‘wreaths round about')." Rabbah son of Rav Shilah said that "according to the space of each with loyot" means "even as a man embracing his companion." ("Loyot" is connected with the root signifying "attach.") Resh Lakish taught that when the Romans entered the Temple (during its destruction) and saw the Cherubim whose bodies were intertwined with one another, they carried them out and mocked the Israelites, saying that a people whose blessings and curses God supposedly fulfilled occupied themselves with such (sensuous) things. And immediately the Romans debased them, as Lamentations 1:8 says: "All that honored her, despised her, because they have seen her nakedness."

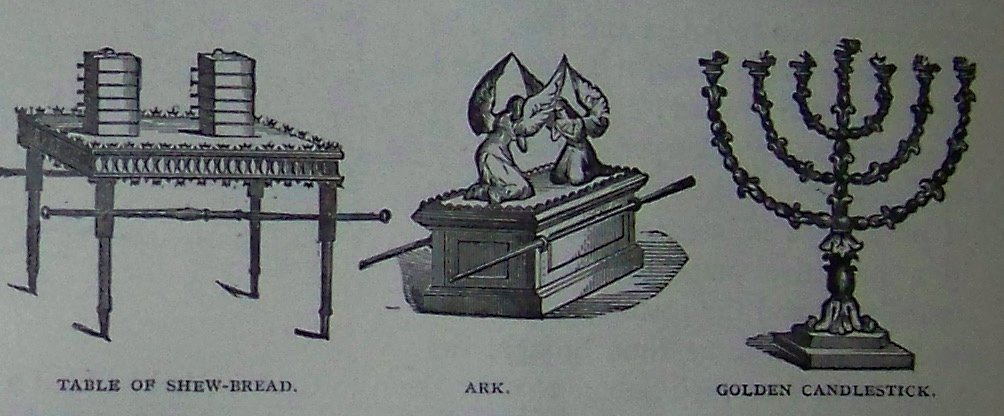
The Table of Shew-Bread, Ark, and Golden Candlestick (illustration from the 1890 Holman Bible)

Rabbi Meir and Rabbi Judah differed over what the "testimony" was that God directed Moses to place in the Ark in Exodus 25:21. Rabbi Meir taught that the Ark contained the stone tablets and a Torah scroll. Rabbi Judah, however, taught that the Ark contained only the stone tablets, with the Torah scroll placed outside. Reading Exodus 25:17, Rabbi Meir noted that the Ark was 2½ cubits long, and as a standard cubit equals 6 handbreadths, the Ark was thus 15 handbreadths long. Rabbi Meir calculated that the tablets were 6 handbreadths long, 6 wide, and 3 thick, and were placed next to each other in the Ark. Thus the tablets accounted for 12 handbreadths, leaving 3 handbreadths unaccounted for. Rabbi Meir subtracted 1 handbreadth for the two sides of the Ark (½ handbreadth for each side), leaving 2 handbreadths for the Torah scroll. Rabbi Meir deduced that a scroll was in the Ark from the words of 1 Kings 8:9, "There was nothing in the Ark save the two tablets of stone that Moses put there." As the words "nothing" and "save" create a limitation followed by a limitation, Rabbi Meir followed the rule of Scriptural construction that a limitation on a limitation implies the opposite—here the presence of something not mentioned—the Torah scroll. Rabbi Judah, however, taught that the cubit of the Ark equaled only 5 handbreadths, meaning that the Ark was 12½ handbreadths long. The tablets (each 6 handbreadths wide) were deposited next to each other in the Ark, accounting for 12 handbreadths. There was thus left half a handbreadth, for which the two sides of the Ark accounted. Accounting next for width of the Ark, Rabbi Judah calculated that the tablets took up 6 handbreadths and the sides of the Ark accounted for ½ handbreadth, leaving 1 handbreadth. There Rabbi Judah taught were deposited the silver columns mentioned in Song of Songs 3:9–10, "King Solomon made himself a palanquin of the wood of Lebanon, he made the pillars thereof of silver." At the side of the Ark was placed the coffer that the Philistines sent as a present, as reported in 1 Samuel 6:8, where the Philistine king said, "And put the jewels of gold which you return him for a guilt offering in a coffer by the side thereof, and send it away that it may go." And on this coffer was placed the Torah scroll, as Deuteronomy 31:26 says, "Take this book of the law, and put it by the side of the Ark of the Covenant of the Lord," demonstrating that the scroll was placed by the side of the Ark and not in it. Rabbi Judah interpreted the double limitation of 1 Kings 8:9, "nothing in the Ark save," to imply that the Ark also contained the fragments of the first tablets that Moses broke. The Gemara further explained that according to Rabbi Judah's theory, before the Philistine coffer came, the Torah scroll was placed on a ledge projecting from the Ark. Rabbi Joshua ben Levi taught his children to be careful to respect an elderly scholar who has forgotten his learning through no fault of his own, for it was said that both the whole tablets and the fragments of the tablets that Moses broke were placed in the Ark.

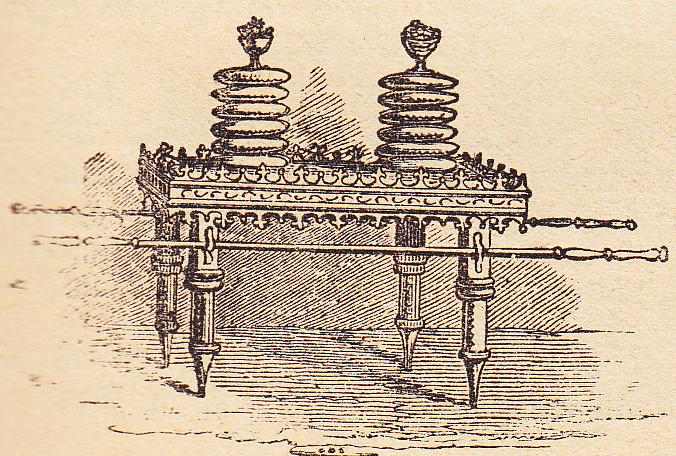
The Table of the Showbread (illustration from the 1890 Peter Fjellstedts bibel)

Rabbi Hanina noted that for all the vessels that Moses made, the Torah gave the measurements of their length, breadth, and height (in Exodus 25:23 for the altar, Exodus 27:1 for the table, and Exodus 30:2 for the incense altar). But for the Ark-cover, Exodus 25:17 gave its length and breadth, but not its height. Rabbi Hanina taught that one can deduce the Ark-cover's height from the smallest of the vessel features, the border of the table, concerning which Exodus 25:25 says, "And you shall make for it a border of a handbreadth round about." Just as the height of the table's border was a handbreadth, so was it also for the Ark-cover. Rav Huna taught that the height of the Ark-cover may be deduced from Leviticus 16:14, which refers to "the face of the ark-cover," and a "face" cannot be smaller than a handbreadth. Rav Aha bar Jacob taught a tradition that the face of the cherubim was not less than a handbreadth, and Rav Huna also made his deduction about the Ark-cover's height from the parallel.

The Mishnah described details of the table envisioned in Exodus 25:23. Rabbi Jose differed with the Mishnah to teach that the handbreadth-high frame described in Exodus 25:25, not props, held the showbread in place, but they interpreted the table's rim to exist only at the feet of the table, not at its surface.

The Mishnah taught that one who stole one of the sacred vessels (kisvot) described in Exodus 25:29 and Numbers 4:7 was struck down by zealots on the spot.

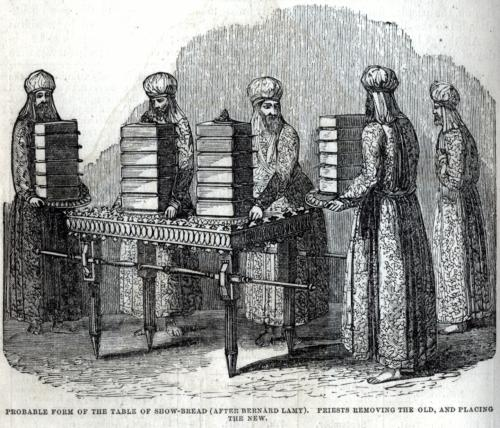
Priests replacing the showbread (19th century illustration)

Ben Zoma interpreted Exodus 25:30 to teach that the showbread had to have faces. And the Tosefta interpreted Exodus 25:30 to teach that the table did not remain overnight without bread.

The Rabbis considered what one needed to do to fulfill the commandment of Exodus 25:30 to set the bread of display before God "continually" (תָּמִיד, tamid)—and the implications of that for the commandment of Joshua 1:8 that "this book of the law shall not depart out of your mouth, but you shall meditate therein day and night." Rabbi Jose taught that even if they took the old bread of display away in the morning and placed the new bread on the table only in the evening, they had honored the commandment to set the bread "continually." Rabbi Ammi analogized from this teaching of Rabbi Jose that people who learn only one chapter of Torah in the morning and one chapter in the evening have nonetheless fulfilled the precept of Joshua 1:8 that "this book of the law shall not depart out of your mouth, but you shall meditate therein day and night." Rabbi Johanan said in the name of Rabbi Simeon ben Yohai that even people who read just the Shema (Deuteronomy 6:4–9) morning and evening thereby fulfill the precept of Joshua 1:8. Rabbi Johanan taught that it is forbidden, however, to teach this to people who through ignorance are careless in the observance of the laws (as it might deter them from further Torah study). But Rava taught that it is meritorious to say it in their presence (as they might think that if merely reciting the Shema twice daily earns reward, how great would the reward be for devoting more time to Torah study).

The Rabbis taught in a Baraita that throughout the 40 years that Simeon the Just served as High Priest, a blessing was bestowed upon the showbread. Every priest who obtained a piece of the showbread as big as an olive ate it and became sated. Some would eat less and leave some uneaten. After the time of Simeon the Just, a curse was sent upon the showbread, so that every priest received a piece as small as a bean. The pious priests withdrew their hands from it, while gluttonous priests took and devoured it. Once a gluttonous priest grabbed his portion as well as that of his fellow, and thereafter they called him "grasper" until his dying day.

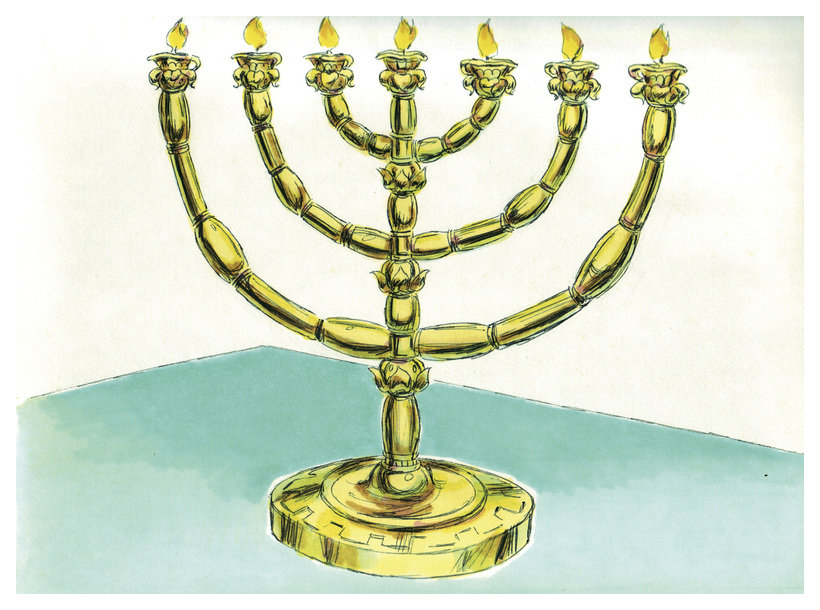
The Lampstand (1984 illustration by Jim Padgett, courtesy of Distant Shores Media/Sweet Publishing)

The Mishnah taught that the absence of one of the seven branches of the menorah mandated in Exodus 25:31–40 invalidated the others and the absence of one of the seven lamps of the menorah invalidated the others. The Gemara explained that this is so because Exodus 25:36 uses the expression "shall be" in this connection. Similarly, the Tosefta taught that invalidity of any of the cups, knops, or flowers of the menorah described in Exodus 25:31 invalidated the others.

Issi ben Judah listed the words "like almond blossoms" in Exodus 25:34 among five passages in the Torah whose grammatical structures are unclear. Issi ben Judah taught that it is unclear whether "like almond blossoms" refers to the cups mentioned before or the knobs and flowers mentioned after.

Rabbi Hiyya bar Abba said in the name of Rabbi Johanan that the angel Gabriel put on something like an artisan's apron and demonstrated to Moses the work of the menorah, for Numbers 8:4 says, "And this was the work of the menorah" (the term "this" implying that something was held up as a pattern or model to illustrate the instructions).

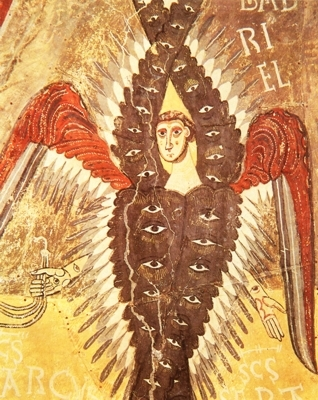
A Seraph (illustration from a medieval manuscript)

Rabbi Abin compared the instruction of Exodus 25:40 to a handsome king who instructed a servant to fashion a bust exactly like him. The servant exclaimed that he could not possibly make a likeness exactly like the king. But the king replied that the servant would paint it with his materials, but the king would appear in his own glory. Thus, when in Exodus 25:40 God told Moses "see that you make them after their pattern," Moses complained that he was not God that he should be able to make one exactly like the pattern. God replied that Moses should follow the pattern of blue, purple, and scarlet that he saw above. The "acacia-wood, standing up" of Exodus 26:15 would reflect the Seraphim who stand above, and Rabbi Hiyya bar Abba said that the gold clasps of Exodus 26:6 would reflect the glittering stars in heaven. Thus God told Moses that if he would make below a replica of that which was above, God would cause God's Shechinah to dwell among the people.

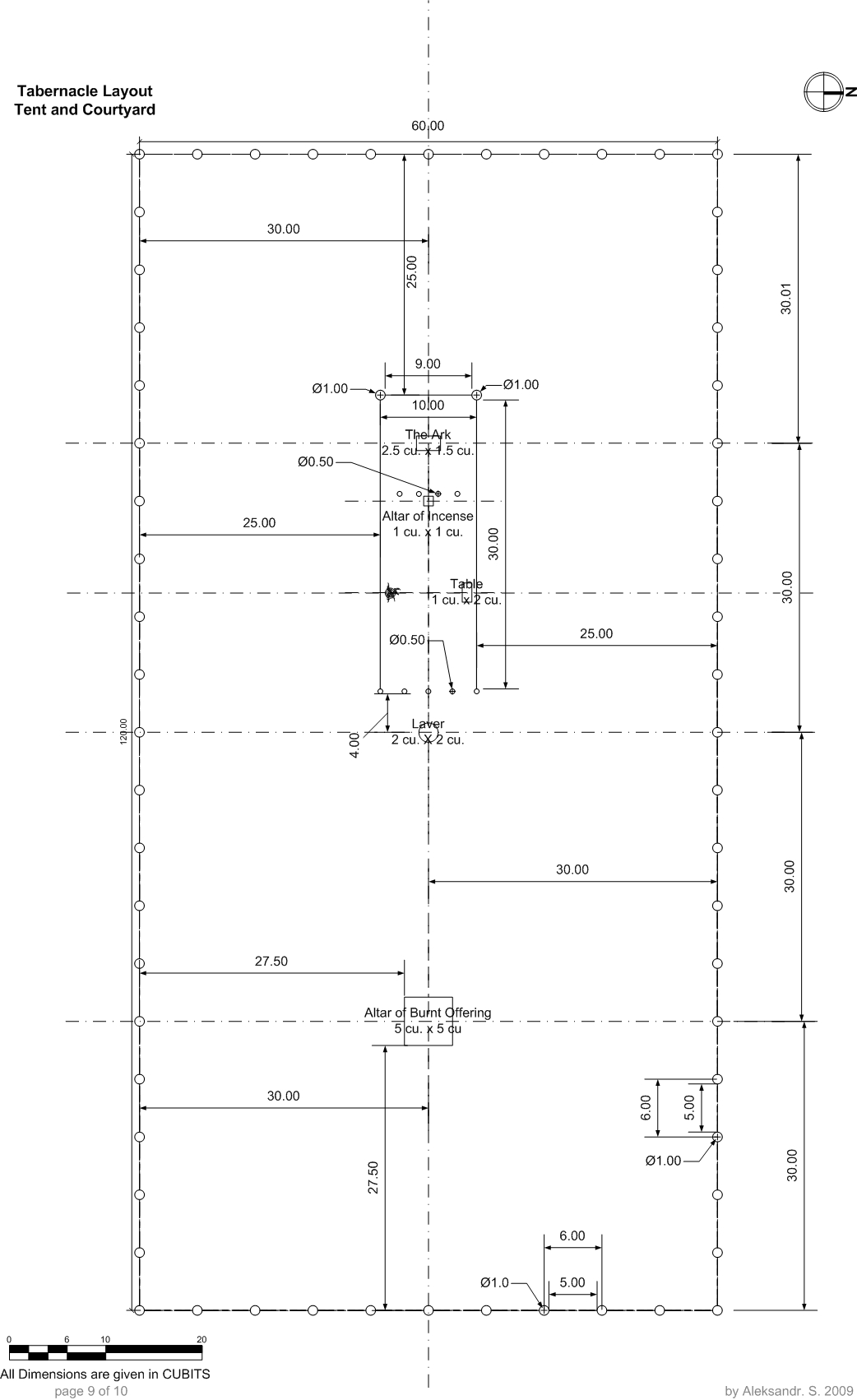
Tabernacle Tent and Courtyard Dimensions (2009 drawing by Aleksig6) (Note that the Rabbis differed over the dimensions of the courtyard, as recorded below.)

=== Exodus chapter 26 ===
Exodus 26:1 instructed the Israelites to make the Tabernacle curtains out of "fine twined linen" (שֵׁשׁ, sheish). The Rabbis taught in a Baraita that whenever the Torah instructed the Israelites to make things with "fine twined linen" (שֵׁשׁ, sheish), they used threads composed of six (שֵׁשׁ, sheish) strands woven into each thread.

Noting that with regard to the curtains in the Tabernacle, Exodus 26:1 calls it "the work of the skillful designer," while Exodus 26:36 calls it "the work of the embroiderer," Rabbi Eleazar read the two verses together. Rabbi Eleazar taught that the embroiderers embroidered over the design that the designers had drawn. Alternatively, a Baraita taught in the name of Rabbi Nehemiah that the embroiderer's work was needlework that was visible on only one face of the cloth, while the designer's work was woven work that appeared on both faces of the cloth.

Rabban Johanan ben Zakai interpreted the word "Lebanon" in Deuteronomy 3:25 to refer to the Temple in Jerusalem and "that goodly mountain" to refer to the Temple Mount. A Midrash employed this understanding of "Lebanon" as the Temple to explain the role of gold in the world. Rabbi Simeon ben Lakish taught that the world did not deserve to have the use of gold. But God created gold for the sake of the Tabernacle (for example, in Exodus 26:6) and the Temple. The Midrash deduced this from the use of the word "good" in both Genesis 2:12, where it says, "the gold of that land is good," and Deuteronomy 3:25, where it says, "that goodly hill-country, and Lebanon," concluding that the gold of the land was created for that which is good, the Temple.

Rav Ashi taught that one could derive from the term עַשְׁתֵּי-עֶשְׂרֵה, ashtei-esreih, or "eleven," in Exodus 26:7 that one who adds to God's word actually subtracts from it. Were one to subtract the first letter of the term, it would yield שְׁתֵּי-עֶשְׂרֵה, shtei-esreih, or "twelve," so adding that letter reduces its meaning.

The Rabbis taught in a Baraita that the Tabernacle's lower curtains were made of blue wool, purple wool, crimson wool, and fine linen, while the upper curtains that made the tent spread were made of goats' hair. And they taught that the upper curtains required greater skill than the lower, for Exodus 35:25 says of the lower ones, "And all the women that were wise-hearted did spin with their hands," while Exodus 35:26 says of the upper ones, "And all the women whose heart stirred them up in wisdom spun the goats." It was taught in Rabbi Nehemiah's name that the hair was washed on the goats and spun while still on the goats.

Rav Adda bar Ahavah said that the tachash skins mentioned in Exodus 26:14 came from an animal that lived in the days of Moses. The Gemara interpreted Rabbi Nehemiah to say that its skin had many colors.

Rabbi Haninah taught that the world was unworthy to have cedar trees, but God created them for the sake of the Tabernacle (for example, in the acacia-wood of Exodus 26:15) and the Temple, as Psalm 104:16 says, "The trees of the Lord have their fill, the cedars of Lebanon, which He has planted," once again interpreting Lebanon to mean the Temple. Rabbi Samuel ben Nahman in the name of Rabbi Jonathan taught that there are 24 kinds of cedars, of which seven are especially fine, as Isaiah 41:19 says, "I will plant in the wilderness the cedar, the acacia-tree, and the myrtle, and the oil-tree; I will set in the desert the cypress, the plane-tree, and the larch together." God foresaw that the Tabernacle would be made of these trees, as Psalm 104:17 says, "Wherein the birds make their nests," and "birds" refers to those birds that the priests offered. And when Psalm 104:17 says, "As for the stork (חֲסִידָה, hasidah), the fir-trees are her house," the חֲסִידָה, hasidah (stork) refers to the High Priest, of whom Deuteronomy 33:8 says, "Your Thummim and Your Urim be with Your holy one (חֲסִידֶךָ, hasidekha)."

Another Midrash explained that in Exodus 26:15, God chose acacia-wood—the wood of a tree that does not bear fruit—to build the Tabernacle to set an example for all time that people should not build houses with the wood of fruit-producing trees.

The Gemara deduced from the report in Exodus 26:16 of the length of the boards that both the Tabernacle and the altar were ten cubits (about 15 feet) high.

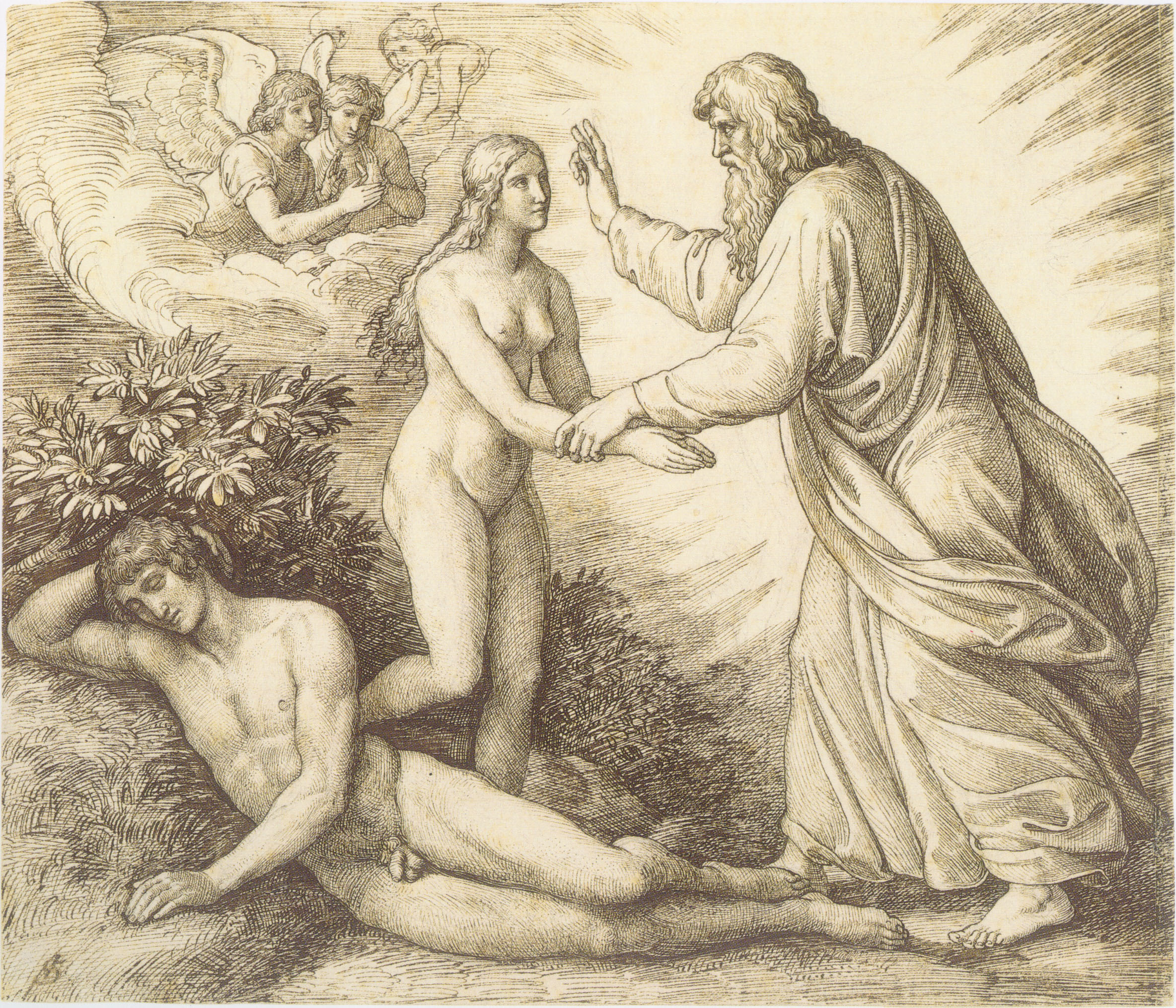
The Creation of Eve (1825 drawing by Julius Schnorr von Carolsfeld)

In Deuteronomy 18:15, Moses foretold that "A prophet will the Lord your God raise up for you . . . like me," and Rabbi Johanan thus taught that prophets would have to be, like Moses, strong, wealthy, wise, and meek. Strong, for Exodus 40:19 says of Moses, "he spread the tent over the tabernacle," and a Master taught that Moses himself spread it, and Exodus 26:16 reports, "Ten cubits shall be the length of a board." Similarly, the strength of Moses can be derived from Deuteronomy 9:17, in which Moses reports, "And I took the two tablets, and cast them out of my two hands, and broke them," and it was taught that the tablets were six handbreadths in length, six in breadth, and three in thickness. Wealthy, as Exodus 34:1 reports God's instruction to Moses, "Carve yourself two tablets of stone," and the Rabbis interpreted the verse to teach that the chips would belong to Moses. Wise, for Rav and Samuel both said that 50 gates of understanding were created in the world, and all but one were given to Moses, for Psalm 8:6 said of Moses, "You have made him a little lower than God." Meek, for Numbers 12:3 reports, "Now the man Moses was very meek."

Rabbi Samuel ben Nahman used the description of the side (צֶלַע, zela) of the tabernacle in Exodus 26:20 to help interpret the creation of woman. Rabbi Jeremiah ben Leazar taught that when God created Adam, God created him a hermaphrodite—two bodies, male and female, joined together—for Genesis 5:2 says, "male and female created He them . . . and called their name Adam." Rabbi Samuel ben Nahman taught that when God created Adam, God created Adam double-faced. Then God split Adam and made Adam of two backs, one back on this side and one back on the other side. An objection was raised that Genesis 2:21 says, "And He took one of his ribs" (implying that God created Eve separately from Adam). Rabbi Samuel ben Nahman replied that the word read as "rib"—מִצַּלְעֹתָיו, mi-zalotav—actually means one of Adam's sides, just as one reads in Exodus 26:20, "And for the second side (צֶלַע, zela) of the tabernacle."

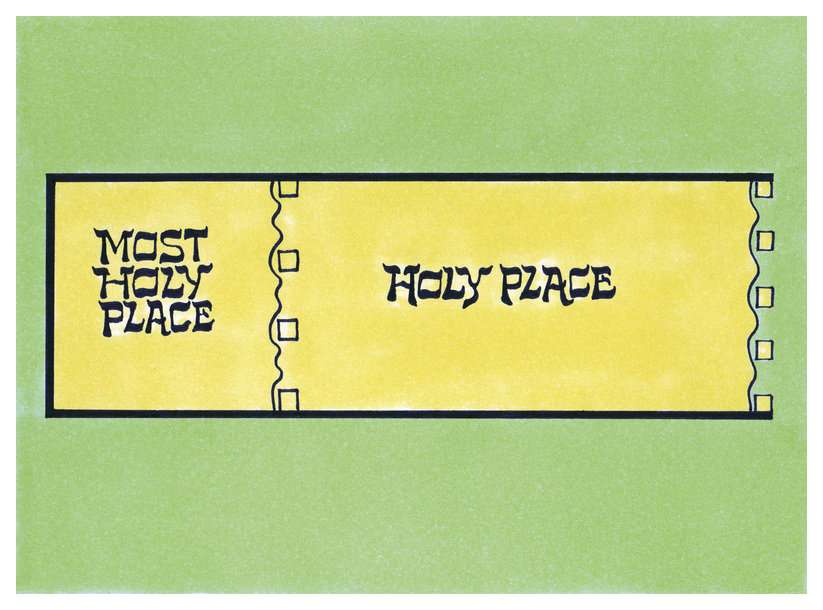
The Tabernacle (1984 illustration by Jim Padgett, courtesy of Distant Shores Media/Sweet Publishing)

Rabbi Levi read Exodus 26:28, regarding "the middle bar in the midst of the boards, which shall pass through from end to end," calculated that the beam must have been 32 cubits in length, and asked where the Israelites would find such a beam in the desert. Rabbi Levi deduced that the Israelites had stored up the cedar to construct the Tabernacle since the days of Jacob. Thus Exodus 35:24 reports, "And every man, with whom was found acacia-wood," not "with whom would be found acacia-wood." Rabbi Levi taught that the Israelites cut the trees down in Magdala of the Dyers near Tiberias and brought them with them to Egypt, and no knot or crack was found in them.

The Mishnah described two veils that separated the Holy Place from the Most Holy Place in the Second Temple, but Rabbi Jose said that there was only a single veil, as described in Exodus 26:33 in connection with the Tabernacle.

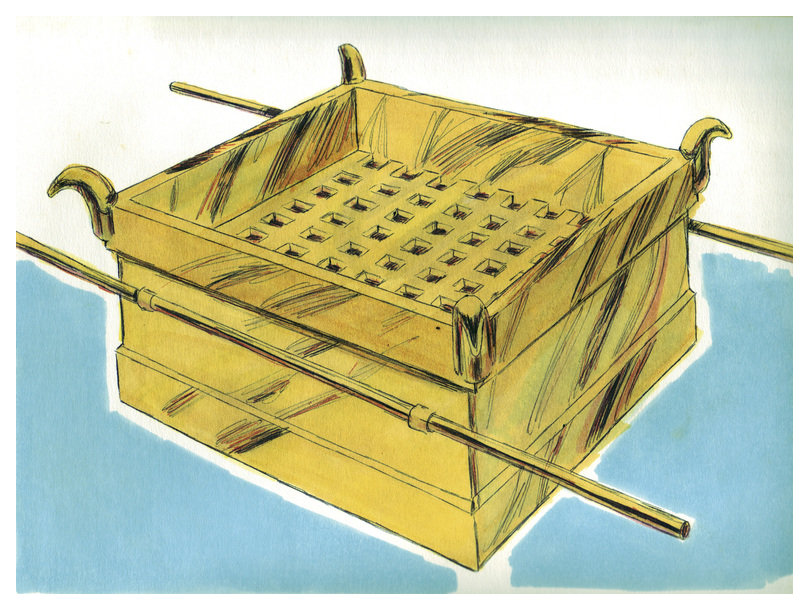
The Outer Altar (1984 illustration by Jim Padgett, courtesy of Distant Shores Media/Sweet Publishing)

=== Exodus chapter 27 ===
Rabbi Judah maintained that the altar was wider than Rabbi Jose thought it was, whereas Rabbi Jose maintained that the altar was taller than Rabbi Judah thought it was. Rabbi Jose said that one should read literally the words of Exodus 27:1, "five cubits long, and five cubits broad." But Rabbi Judah noted that Exodus 27:1 uses the word "square" (רָבוּעַ, ravua), just as Ezekiel 43:16 uses the word "square" (רָבוּעַ, ravua). Rabbi Judah argued that just as in Ezekiel 43:16, the dimension was measured from the center (so that the dimension described only one quadrant of the total), so the dimensions of Exodus 27:1 should be measured from the center (and thus, according to Rabbi Judah, the altar was 10 cubits on each side.) The Gemara explained that we know that this is how to understand Ezekiel 43:16 because Ezekiel 43:16 says, "And the hearth shall be 12 cubits long by 12 cubits broad, square," and Ezekiel 43:16 continues, "to the four sides thereof," teaching that the measurement was taken from the middle (interpreting "to" as intimating that from a particular point, there were 12 cubits in all directions, hence from the center). Rabbi Jose, however, reasoned that a common use of the word "square" applied to the height of the altar. Rabbi Judah said that one should read literally the words of Exodus 27:1, "And the height thereof shall be three cubits." But Rabbi Jose noted that Exodus 27:1 uses the word "square" (רָבוּעַ, ravua), just as Exodus 30:2 uses the word "square" (רָבוּעַ, ravua, referring to the inner altar). Rabbi Jose argued that just as in Exodus 30:2 the altar's height was twice its length, so too in Exodus 27:1, the height was to be read as twice its length (and thus the altar was 10 cubits high). Rabbi Judah questioned Rabbi Jose's conclusion, for if priests stood on the altar to perform the service 10 cubits above the ground, the people would see them from outside the courtyard. Rabbi Jose replied to Rabbi Judah that Numbers 4:26 states, "And the hangings of the court, and the screen for the door of the gate of the court, which is by the Tabernacle and by the altar round about," teaching that just as the Tabernacle was 10 cubits high, so was the altar 10 cubits high; and Exodus 38:14 says, "The hangings for the one side were fifteen cubits" (teaching that the walls of the courtyard were 15 cubits high). The Gemara explained that according to Rabbi Jose's reading, the words of Exodus 27:18, "And the height five cubits," meant from the upper edge of the altar to the top of the hangings. And according to Rabbi Jose, the words of Exodus 27:1, "and the height thereof shall be three cubits," meant that there were three cubits from the edge of the terrace (on the side of the altar) to the top of the altar. Rabbi Judah, however, granted that the priest could be seen outside the Tabernacle, but argued that the sacrifice in his hands could not be seen.

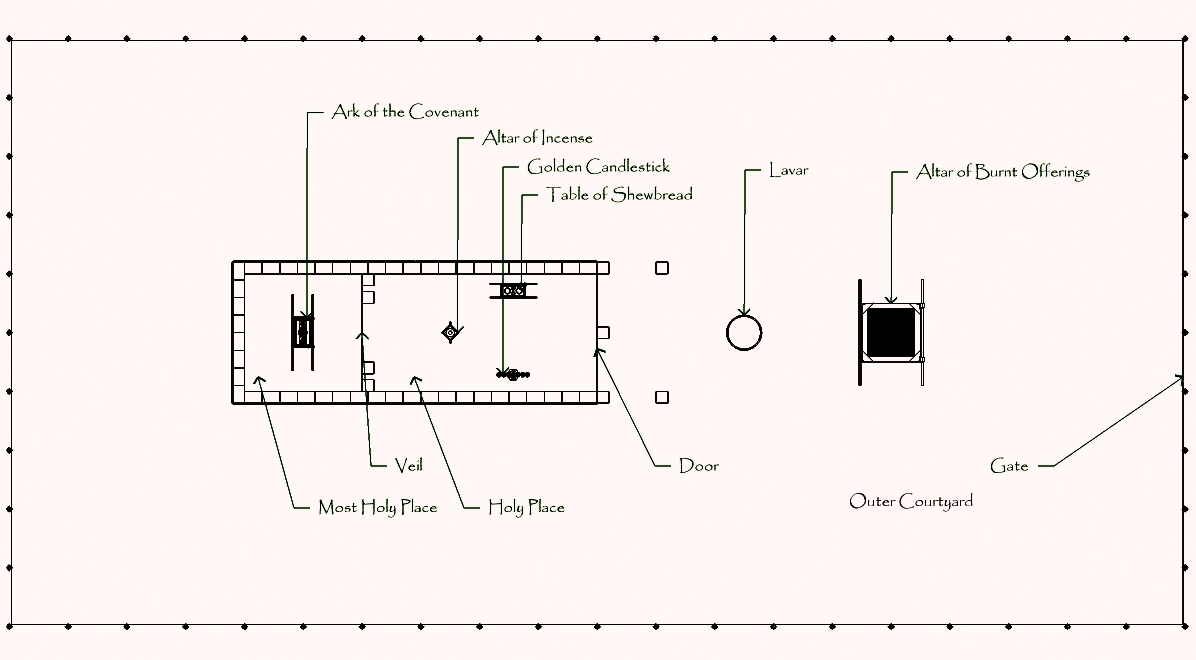
Schematic of the Tabernacle (2009 drawing by Gabriel Fink)

A Midrash taught that the altar was overlaid with copper (נְחֹשֶׁת, nechosheit), as Exodus 27:2 instructs, to atone for the Israelites' brazen forehead (מֵצַח הַנְּחֹשֶׁת, meitzach ha-nechosheit), as Isaiah 48:4 says, "Your neck is an iron sinew, and your forehead brazen (נְחוּשָׁה, nechushah)."

Rabbi Jose noted that even though Exodus 27:18 reported that the Tabernacle's courtyard was just 100 cubits by 50 cubits (about 150 feet by 75 feet), a little space held a lot, as Leviticus 8:3 implied that the space miraculously held the entire Israelite people.

A Midrash taught that the length of the courtyard reported in Exodus 27:18 at 100 cubits added to the length of the Tabernacle—30 cubits—to total 130 cubits. And the Midrash taught that this number was alluded to when (as Numbers 7:37 reports) the prince of the Tribe of Simeon brought an offering of "one silver dish, the weight of which was 130 shekels." The Midrash taught that the dish was in allusion to the court that encompassed the Tabernacle as the sea encompasses the world.

The Gemara, however, cited Abaye's as the plain meaning of the words, "The length of the court shall be 100 cubits, and the breadth 50 everywhere," in Exodus 27:18. Abaye taught that the Israelites erected the Tabernacle 50 cubits from the entrance to the courtyard, so that there might be a space of 50 cubits in front of the Tabernacle and a space of 20 cubits on every other side of the Tabernacle.

A Midrash taught that God considers studying the sanctuary's structure as equivalent to rebuilding it.

== In medieval Jewish interpretation ==
The parashah is discussed in these medieval Jewish sources:

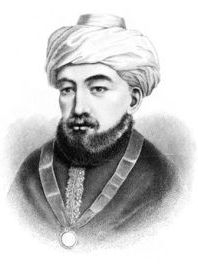
Moses Maimonides

=== Exodus chapter 25 ===
Maimonides taught that God told the Israelites to build to a Sanctuary in Exodus 25:8 and instituted the practice of sacrifices generally as transitional steps to wean the Israelites off of the worship of the times and move them toward prayer as the primary means of worship. Maimonides noted that in nature, God created animals that develop gradually. For example, when a mammal is born, it is extremely tender, and cannot eat dry food, so God provided breasts that yield milk to feed the young animal, until it can eat dry food. Similarly, Maimonides taught, God instituted many laws as temporary measures, as it would have been impossible for the Israelites suddenly to discontinue everything to which they had become accustomed. So God sent Moses to make the Israelites (in the words of Exodus 19:6) "a kingdom of priests and a holy nation." But the general custom of worship in those days was sacrificing animals in temples that contained idols. So God did not command the Israelites to give up those manners of service, but allowed them to continue. God transferred to God's service what had formerly served as a worship of idols, and commanded the Israelites to serve God in the same manner—namely, to build to a Sanctuary (Exodus 25:8), to erect the altar to God's name (Exodus 20:21), to offer sacrifices to God (Leviticus 1:2), to bow down to God, and to burn incense before God. God forbad doing any of these things to any other being and selected priests for the service in the Temple in Exodus 28:41. By this Divine plan, God blotted out the traces of idolatry, and established the great principle of the Existence and Unity of God. But the sacrificial service, Maimonides taught, was not the primary object of God's commandments about sacrifice; rather, supplications, prayers, and similar kinds of worship are nearer to the primary object. Thus God limited sacrifice to only one Temple (see Deuteronomy 12:26) and the priesthood to only the members of a particular family. These restrictions, Maimonides taught, served to limit sacrificial worship, and kept it within such bounds that God did not feel it necessary to abolish sacrificial service altogether. But in the Divine plan, prayer and supplication can be offered everywhere and by every person, as can be the wearing of tzitzit (Numbers 15:38) and tefillin (Exodus 13:9, 16) and similar kinds of service.

Maimonides taught that the belief in the existence of angels was connected with the belief in the existence of God, and the belief in God and angels led to the belief in prophecy and the Law. To support this understanding, God commanded the Israelites to make over the Ark the form of two angels. Maimonides taught that there was not a single cherub so that the people would not be misled to mistake it for God's image or to assume that the angel was a deity. By making two cherubim and declaring (in Deuteronomy 6:4) "the Lord is our God, the Lord is One," Moses proclaimed the theory of the existence of a number of angels and that they were not deities.

== In modern interpretation ==
The parashah is discussed in these modern sources:

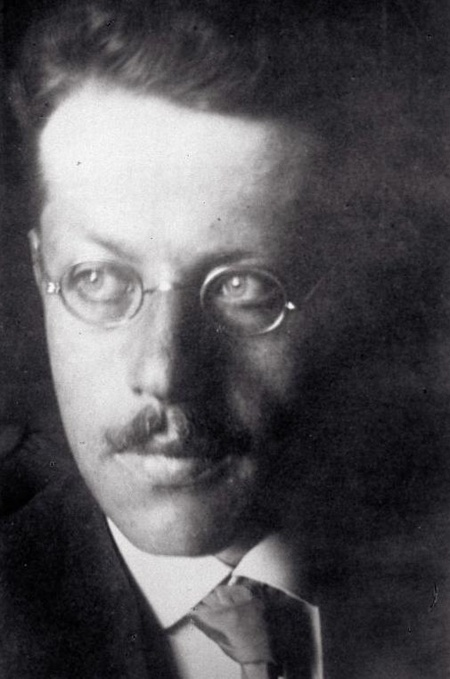
Rosenzweig

=== Exodus chapters 25–27 ===
Franz Rosenzweig argued that the building of the Tabernacle was the Torah's goal and pinnacle: In Egyptian slavery, the Israelites had made buildings for the pharaohs, now they were privileged to labor for God's sake, thus confirming their freedom.

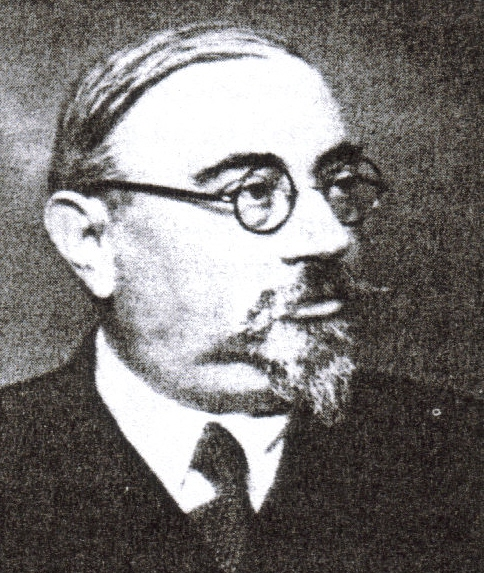
Cassuto

Umberto Cassuto argued that the purpose of the Tabernacle (literally, "Dwelling") in Exodus 25:1–27:21 was to serve as a tangible symbol of God's presence among the Israelites, who were about to journey away from Mount Sinai, the site of the theophany where they had witnessed the revelation of God. As long as they were encamped at Sinai, they were conscious of God's nearness, but once they set out on their journey, the link would seem broken without the symbol in their midst.

Terence Fretheim argued that Exodus 25–31 represent a climax in both Israel's and God's journeys, signaling a change in God's presence with Israel: (1) God's occasional appearance on the mountain or at the traveling tent (in Exodus 33:7–11) became the ongoing presence of God with Israel; (2) God's distance from the people changed from the remote mountaintop to the center of the camp; and (3) God's dwelling was no longer a fixed place but portable, on the move with God's people.

Robert Alter reported the strong scholarly consensus that Exodus 25–27 is the work of the Priestly source (P), reflecting P's special fascination with the details of cultic paraphernalia. Alter argued that the Biblical editors chose to introduce this block of material when Moses had disappeared into the cloud on the mountaintop to offer a reassuring antithesis to the people's fearful distance from the fiery Divine presence and the closeness of Moses to God. The architectural plan for the Tabernacle promised that God would come down from above to dwell among God's people within the Tabernacle's secure sanctum. As well, the Divinely-endorsed donations contrast with the transgressive donations that enable the Golden Calf in Exodus 32.

Meyers argued that although a modest tent shrine, perhaps reflected in the term "tent of meeting" (אֹהֶל מוֹעֵד, ohel moed) in Exodus 27:21, would have been possible, the elaborate and costly structure of Exodus 25–27 likely in part reflected the actual Jerusalem Temple. Like Mount Sinai (in Exodus 19:20–25) and the Jerusalem Temple, the Tabernacle had three zones of sanctity. Thus unlike religious edifices today, which are places for people to enter and worship, the Tabernacle was like temples and shrines in the ancient world, which were considered earthly residences for deities (see Exodus 25.8), off-limits for most humans—costly, well-furnished structures befitting their divine occupants.

Tigay reported that scholars debate whether the Tabernacle actually existed. Some believe that Exodus 25–27 describes some form of the First Temple in Jerusalem, historically retrojected into the period of the wanderings to give it legitimacy. Others note parallels to aspects of the Tabernacle's architecture in second millennium Egypt and Mari, Syria, and among Arab tribes, and suggest that (at least in broad strokes) the Tabernacle reflected a recollection of a sanctuary that may have antedated the Israelites' settlement in Canaan.

=== Exodus chapter 25 ===
Tigay noted that Exodus 25:3 lists metals and Exodus 25:4–5 lists fabrics in descending order of quality, and the material of which an item was made depended on its proximity to the Holy of Holies. Nahum Sarna observed that iron is notably absent, either on account of its great rarity at the time or because its use for more efficient weapons of death made it incompatible with the spiritual ends that the Tabernacle served.

Citing an Akkadian term that indicates a yellow or orange dye, Alter argued that the word תְּחָשִׁים, techashim in Exodus 25:5 is more plausibly translated as "ocher-dyed skins" than "dolphin skins" or "dugong skins." Alter argued that the yellow or orange coloring would be in keeping with the brilliantly dyed stuff in Exodus 25:4. Richard Elliott Friedman wrote that no one knows what the term means, noting that it has been translated to be dolphin skins, badger skins, goatskins, and skins of a particular color. Friedman wrote that it is a cognate of an Arabic word for dolphin, but, since it does not occur in the list of animals that are forbidden or permitted for food in Leviticus 11, it may not refer to a particular species of animal at all. Friedman concluded that it may just mean tanned skins or leather.

Sharon Sobel observed that when God stated in Exodus 25:8, “Let them make me a sanctuary,” the word “them” referred to both men and women. In Exodus 35:1, beginning the parallel description of the Tabernacle's construction that corresponds to the instructions given in Parashat Terumah, Moses explicitly brought together all the community of Israel, including both men and women, as confirmed by Exodus 35:22, “men and women, all whose hearts moved them, all who would make an offering”; Exodus 35:25–26, “all the skilled women spun with their own hands and brought what they had spun . . . ; and all the women who excelled in that skill spun the goats’ hair”; and Exodus 35:29, “thus the Israelites, all the men and women whose hearts moved them to bring anything for the work that the Lord, through Moses, had commanded to be done, brought it as a freewill offering to the Lord.” Sobel concluded that the Torah text thus tells us that it is necessary for the entire community, including both men and women, to be involved to bring God's presence into their midst. Similarly, Meyers noted that both women and men provided the materials to which Exodus 25:1–9 and Exodus 35:4–29 refer, as Exodus 35:22 and 29 make clear, including fabrics made and donated by women craftspersons (as indicated in Exodus 35:25–26).

Sarna noted that Exodus 25:8 speaks of God dwelling not "in it," that is, in the Tabernacle, but "among them," that is, among the Israelites. Sarna observed that the verb "to dwell" is not the common Hebrew y-sh-v but the rarer sh-k-n, which conveys the idea of temporary lodging in a tent as in the nomadic lifestyle. Sarna concluded that the Tabernacle was not God's abode, as were similar pagan structures. Rather, Sarna argued, the Tabernacle made perceptible and tangible the conception of God's immanence, that is, of the indwelling of the Divine Presence in the Israelite camp.

Meyers suggested that the word "pattern" in Exodus 25:9 referred to the heavenly abode after which the earthly abode was to be modeled. Bruce Wells reported, however, that scholars debate the meaning of the word "pattern." One possibility is that the item God showed Moses represented God's dwelling place in the heavens. The other possibility is that Exodus 25:9 refers simply to a scale model of the structure that God commanded Moses to build. Wells noted that several ancient Near Eastern texts support this second option, referring to instances where gods revealed models of or plans for religious objects to those responsible for building them. In one Middle Babylonian document, a clay model of the statue of the god Shamash was miraculously discovered near the Euphrates, which showed long-missing information about how the statue was to look and what clothing was to adorn it, allowing the Babylonian king to then make a new statue.

Alter wrote that the instruction of Exodus 25:16 to place the stone tablets of the Ten Commandments in the Tabernacle reflected a common ancient Near Eastern practice of placing documents of solemn contracts within sacred precincts.

Alter wrote that the term "cherubim" (כְּרֻבִים, keruvim) in Exodus 25:18 is derived from a root that suggests hybrid or composite and perhaps also "steed," and refers to fearsome winged beasts like the Egyptian sphinx that figure in poetry as God's celestial steeds.

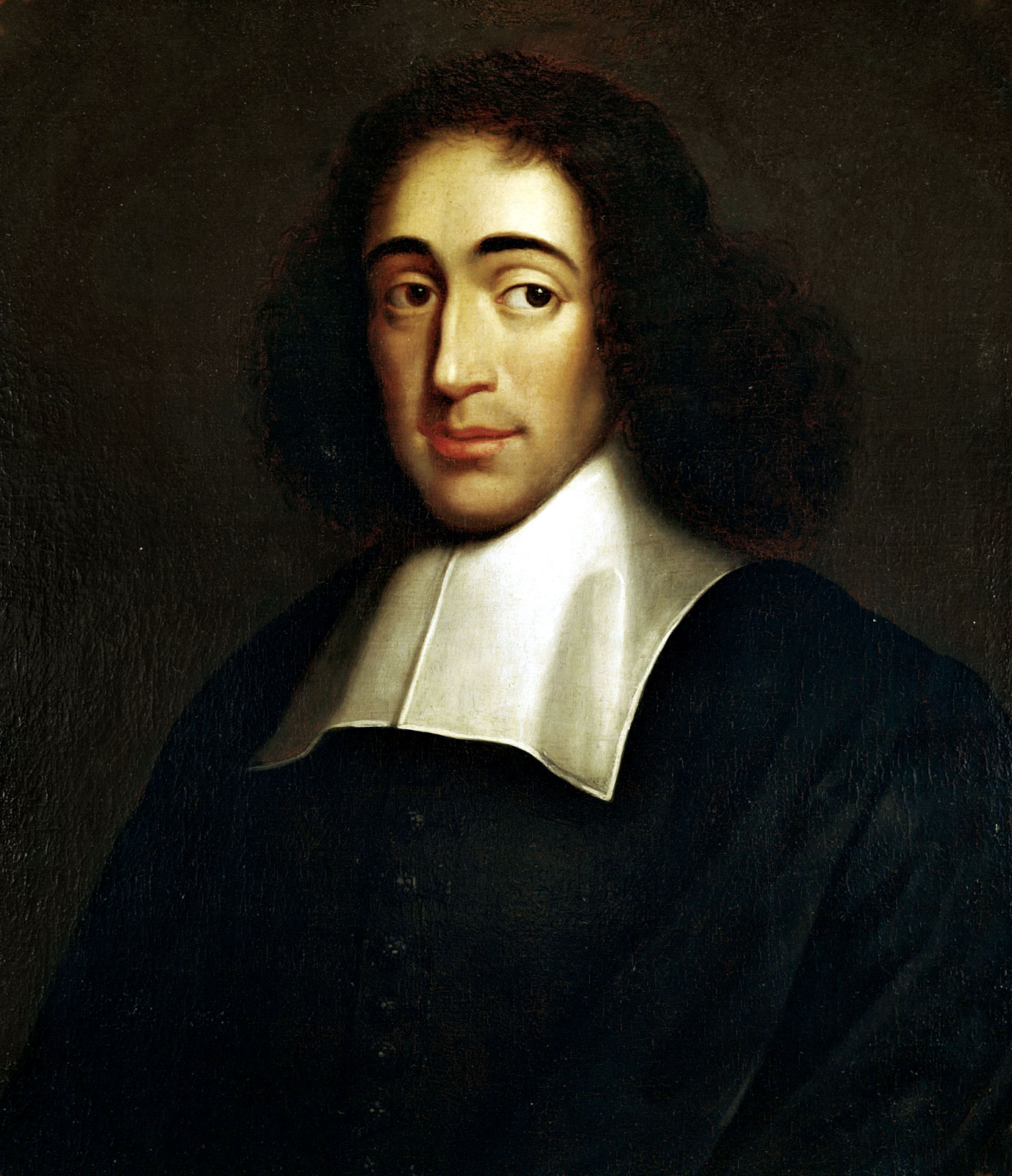
Spinoza

Baruch Spinoza asserted that a perusal of Scripture shows that all God's revelations to the prophets were made through words or appearances, or a combination of the two, and these words and appearances were either real, when external to the mind of the prophet who heard or saw them, or imaginary, when the imagination of the prophet was in a state that led the prophet distinctly to suppose that the prophet heard or saw them. Spinoza read Exodus 25:22, where God says, "And there I will meet with you and I will commune with you from the mercy seat that is between the Cherubim," to report that God revealed to Moses the laws that God wished to transmit to the Israelites with a real voice. Spinoza argued that God must necessarily have employed some sort of real voice, for Moses found God ready to commune with him at any time. And Spinoza argued that this, where God proclaimed the law, was the only instance of a real voice.

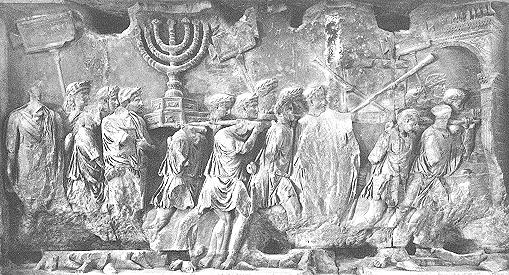
Romans take the menorah from the Temple (sculpture from the Arch of Titus)

Noting the botanical terms (branches, calyxes, almond blossoms, petals) in the description of the lampstand in Exodus 25:31–40, Meyers suggested that the lampstand represented a sacred tree and perhaps God as source of fertility.

Gunther Plaut traced the history of the menorah, reporting that, as depicted on the Arch of Titus, the Roman army took the menorah to Rome as war booty. After that, Jews carried on the intent of the commandment in Exodus 27:20–21 to light the menorah by keeping a separate light, a ner tamid, in the synagogue. Originally Jews set the ner tamid opposite the ark on the synagogue's western wall, but then moved it to a niche by the side of the ark and later to a lamp suspended above the ark. Plaut reported that the ner tamid has come to symbolize God's presence, a spiritual light emanating as if from the Temple.

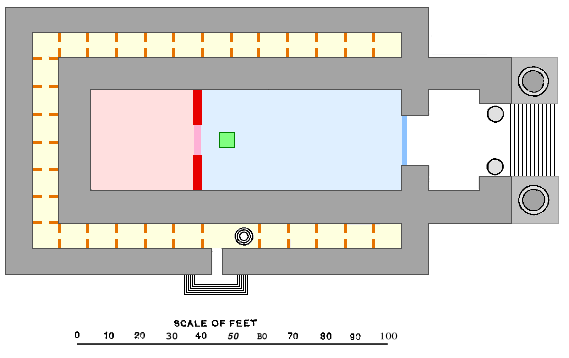
Plan of Solomon's Temple with the Holy of Holies in pink (illustration from the 1903 Encyclopaedia Biblica)

=== Exodus chapter 26 ===
Friedman observed that the cubit-and-a-half width of each board used to construct the Tabernacle described in Exodus 26:16 is strange, as he presumed that ancient Israelites carried a one-cubit-long measuring string. Friedman asked why the Israelites would design a structure with one-and-a-half-cubit components instead of one-cubit or two-cubit. Friedman explained the unusual one-and-a-half cubit width by positing that the extra half cubit was for overlapping with the adjacent board. Friedman reported that architects whom he consulted said that such an overlapping arrangement would have advantages of stability and ventilation. Based on this arrangement, Friedman suggested that the Tabernacle was 20 cubits long and 6 to 8 cubits wide and that the Tabernacle would thus have been just the size to fit under the outstretched wings between the two cherubim that 1 Kings 6:20-24 describes inside of the Holy of Holies in Solomon's Temple. Friedman concluded from this that the author of the Priestly source thought to have written this material must have lived before Nebuchadnezzar II destroyed Solomon's Temple in 587 BCE.

Mark Smith saw in the word for these boards, קְּרָשִׁים, kerashim, a connection to the dwelling place of the Canaanite god El, called krsh, for "tabernacle" or "pavilion." Smith cited this as one of several reasons that he concluded that the Israelite God יְהוָה, YHVH, and El were identified at an early stage.

== Commandments ==
According to Maimonides and the Sefer ha-Chinuch, there are 2 positive and 1 negative commandments in the parashah:

- To build a Sanctuary
- Not to remove the staves from the Ark of the Covenant
- To make the showbread

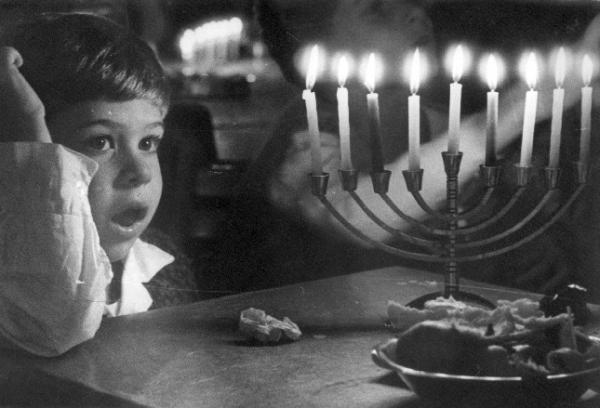
Hanukkah menorah

== Liturgy ==
God's Presence in a throne between cherubim in Exodus 25:17–22 is reflected in Psalm 99:1, which is in turn one of the six Psalms recited at the beginning of the Kabbalat Shabbat prayer service.

The kindled lights of the Menorah of Exodus 25:31–40 played a key role in Hanukkah and are thus in turn noted in the Hanukkah insertion to the Modim section of the Amidah prayer in each of the three prayer services.

== Weekly maqam ==
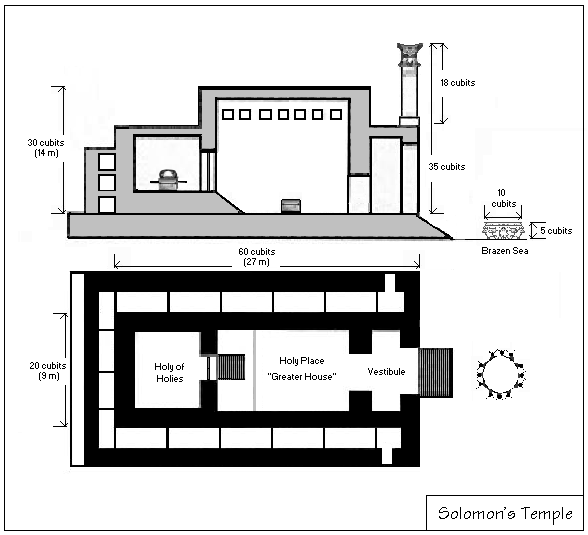
Solomon's Temple (2005 drawing by Mattes)

In the Weekly Maqam, Eastern Sephardi Jews each week base the songs of the services on the content of that week's parashah. For Parashat Terumah, Sephardi Jews apply Maqam Hoseni, the maqam that expresses beauty, as it is the parashah where the beauty of the Tabernacle and its utensils are elaborated.

== Haftarah ==
The haftarah for the parashah is 1 Kings 5:26–6:13.

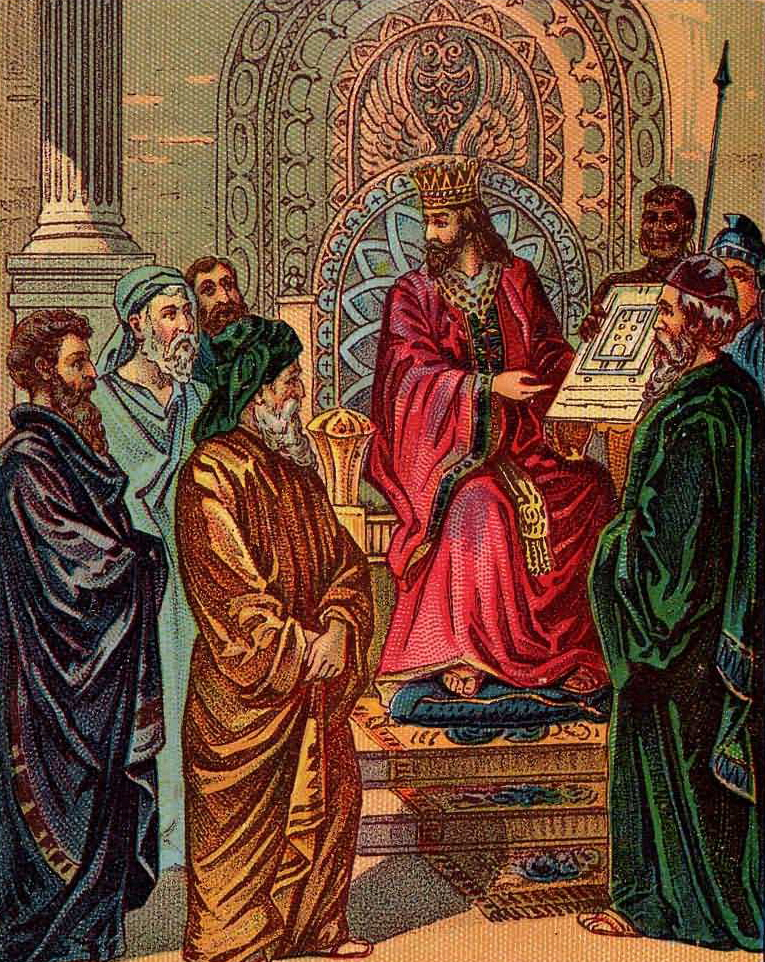
Solomon and the Plan for the Temple (illustration from a Bible card published 1896 by the Providence Lithograph Company)

=== Summary ===
God gave King Solomon wisdom, and Solomon made a peace treaty with King Hiram I of Tyre. Solomon directed his tax collector Adoniram to draft 30,000 men and send them to Lebanon in shifts of 10,000, with one month in Lebanon and two months at home. Solomon also had 70,000 men who bore burdens, 80,000 men who hewed stone in the mountains, and 3,300 chief officers who supervised the work. Solomon ordered great and costly stones cut to lay the foundation of the Temple in Jerusalem, and Solomon's builders, Hiram's builders, and the Gebalites fashioned them and prepared the timber and the stones to build the Temple.

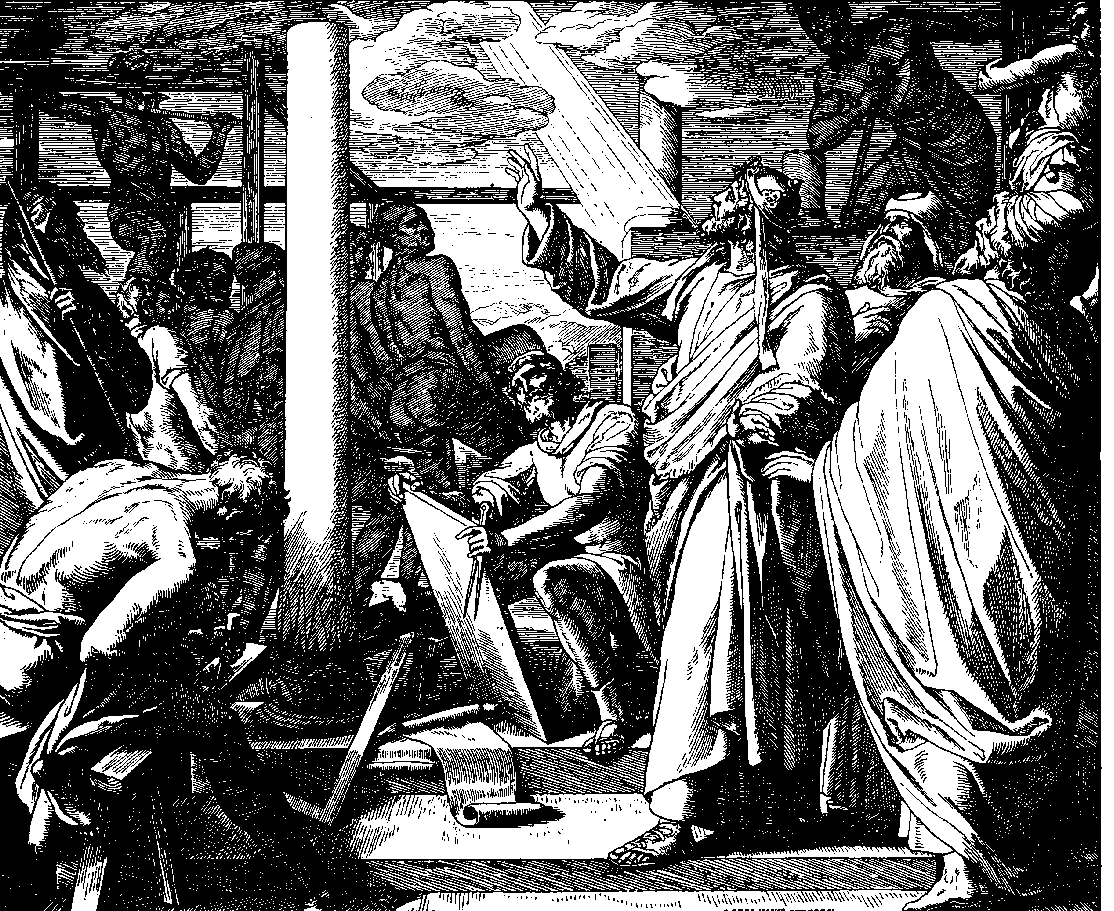
Solomon Builds the Temple (woodcut by Julius Schnorr von Carolsfeld from the 1860 Die Bibel in Bildern)

Solomon began to build the Temple in the 480th year after the Israelites came out of Egypt, in the fourth year of his reign, in the month Ziv. The Temple measured 60 cubits long, 20 cubits wide, and 30 cubits high, and had a portico 20 cubits long and 10 cubits deep. Its windows were broad within and narrow without. Along the Temple's wall all around were side-structures and side-chambers, with the lowest story of the side-structure 5 cubits broad, the middle 6 cubits broad, and the third story 7 cubits broad, and recesses ringed the outside wall. The Temple was built from stone made ready at the quarry, and no hammer, ax, or other iron tool was heard at the building site. The door for the lowest story of side-chambers was on the right side of the Temple, and winding stairs went into the middle story and out into the third. So Solomon built the Temple and finished it with planks of cedar over beams, with all the Temple resting on cedar timbers.

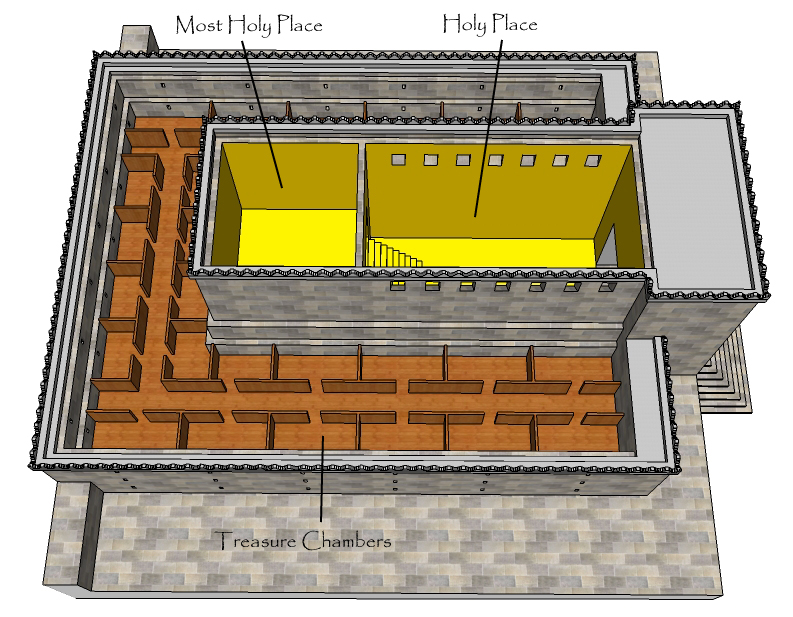
Solomon's Temple (2009 computer-generated drawing by Gabriel Fink)

And the word of the Lord came to Solomon, saying: "As for this house that you are building, if you will walk in My statutes, and execute My ordinances, and keep all My commandments, then I will establish My word with you that I spoke to David your father and I will dwell therein among the children of Israel, and will not forsake My people Israel."

=== Connection to the Parashah ===
Both the parashah and the haftarah describe a great Jewish leader's marshalling of resources to build a dwelling place for God, the parashah in Moses' collection of gifts to build the Tabernacle, and the haftarah in Solomon's conscription of labor and collection of timber and stone to build the Temple in Jerusalem. Both the parashah and the haftarah describe conditions for a structure where God could dwell (ve-shakhanti) among (be-tokh) the Israelites.

=== On Shabbat Zachor ===
When the parashah coincides with the special Sabbath Shabbat Zachor (as it did in 2021), the haftarah is 1 Samuel 15:2–34.

=== On Shabbat Rosh Chodesh ===
When the parashah coincides with the special Sabbath Shabbat Rosh Chodesh, the haftarah is Isaiah 66:1–24. However, if there is not a leap year, then the Rosh Chodesh Shabbat Adar is also Shabbat Shekalim, reading from the haftarah for Ashkenazi Jews is Kings II 12:1-17
