= Simi bar Chiya =

Jewish rabbi mentioned in the Talmud

Simi bar Chiya was a Jewish rabbi mentioned in the text of the Talmud. He was a contemporary of Rav.
