= Rami b. Abba =

Rami bar Abba II (Hebrew: רמי בר אבא (השני)) was a Babylonian rabbi, of the sixth generation of amoraim.

== Biography ==
Once Rami wanted to build a new synagogue, by taking bricks and beams from an old synagogue and use them for the new synagogue in a different location. In general halacha prohibits of dismantling a synagogue before one has built another to take its place, lest the new one not end up being built. Rami asked whether this was permitted in his case, since the materials of the old synagogue would be used for the new. He asked Rav Papa and then R. Huna b. Joshua (or according to another version, Rav Papi and then R. Huna b. Tahlifa) who both prohibited him from doing so.

According to Sheiltot of Ahai of Shabha, Rami b. Abba was Rav Ashi's father-in-law, and probably it is this Rami b. Abba (and not Rami b. Abba I).
