= Rav Kahana IV =

For other Amoraic sages of Babylonia with the name "Rav Kahana", see Rav Kahana.

Rav Kahana IV (Hebrew: רב כהנא (הרביעי)) was a Babylonian rabbi, of the fifth and sixth generation of amoraim.

== Biography ==
He was the cousin of Rav Ashi and served as the Dean of the Pumbedita Academy from 395 (ד'קנ"ו, Hebrew calendar) until 412 (ד'קע"ג, Hebrew calendar).

He lived in Pum Nahara, and was head of the court there.

One of his children died shortly after birth. His sons seem to have been wealthy.

Despite being of the same generation as Rav Papa and Huna b. Joshua, he did not study with them, though he did value their teachings. He debated Rav Ashi on issues of the Halakha, and called Ashi by the honorific title "Mar". He was close to Rav Zevid, and eulogized Zevid upon his death.

The Talmud describes his death.
