= Rav Papi =

Babylonian rabbi, of the fifth generation of amoraim

Rav Papi (or Rav Pappai; Hebrew: רב פפי) was a Babylonian rabbi, of the fifth generation of amoraim.

== Biography ==
Rav Papi was the son-in-law of Rabbi Isaac Nappaha, while his main rabbi was Rava, and he repeats many teachings in Rava's name. He was a colleague and an opponent of Rav Papa and Rav Huna b. Joshua. His students include Rav Ashi and Ravina I.
