= Hanina =

Second and third generation amora

Rav Hanina (Hebrew: רב חנינא), also known as Hananiah (חנניא; sometimes spelled Hananyah), was a second- or third-generation amora of the Land of Israel.

== Biography ==
Rav Hanina was born in Babylonia in the end of the 3rd century and moved to the land of Israel in his youth, along with Hoshaiah (possibly Hoshaiah II). He is noted in tractate Ketubot 56a as a student of Rabbi Yannai, and, in Yevamot 58b and Kiddushin 60a, as a student of Rabbi Yochanan bar Nafcha, as well.

He was the scion of a family of great sages, and the brother of R. Hoshaiah Rabbah. Hoshaiah is once referred to as "Rabbi Hoshaiah bar Rabbi Hama", which suggests that Hanina is the same as Hanina bar Hama, though other opinions suggest they were different individuals.

Hanina was a bachelor all his life, and together with his brother Hoshaiah sold shoes for prostitutes, and yet they did not raise their eyes to see them. Rava stated that it was with respect to these two brothers that it is said that if a bachelor lives in a city and does not sin, God proclaims his praise every day.

Several stories indicate that he had extensive medical knowledge.

R. Yochanan bar Nafcha wanted to ordain him a Rabbi but failed, until R. Hanina explained to him that he is a descendant of the house of Eli the priest, upon whom a curse was uttered: " and there shall not be an elder in thy house for ever". A curse that is aimed in its biblical sense, "an elder" – a Rabbi – a descendant of Eli.

== Quotes ==
- No man can hurt his finger in this terrestrial world, unless it were first decreed upon him in the celestial world.
- Never let the blessing of a commoner be esteemed a light thing in thy sight.
