= Rafram II =

Rafram (II) (Hebrew: רפרם, read as Rafram) was Babylonian rabbi, of the seventh generation of amoraim.

He was a disciple of Rav Ashi and a colleague of Ravina II. He succeeded R. Geviha as head of the Academy of Pumbedita. He headed the Pumbedita academy for ten years until his death on 443.
