= Rabbah Tosafa'ah =

Babylonian rabbi

Rabbah Tosafa'ah (Hebrew: רבה תוספאה or Hebrew: רבא תוספאה) was a Babylonian rabbi, of the eighth generation of amoraim.

== Biography ==
Opinions differ on the origin of his second name, "Tosefa'ah", seemingly from the Aramaic word tosefta (addition). According to one theory, the Talmud was substantially complete by this point, and he "added on" to the already existing work. Others say he was an expert in the braitot and Tosefta which supplement the main works of the Oral Torah. According to a third approach, "Tosefa'ah" derives from his place of origin, perhaps Tushpa.

He was a pupil of Ravina I and a contemporary of Ravina II, with whom, sometimes, he is mentioned in the Talmud. He succeeded Mar bar Rav Ashi as head of the Sura Academy, a position he held for six years (approximately 467-474). He died in 494.

== Teachings ==
A few independent decisions of Rabbah have been preserved. One of them assumes that a woman's pregnancy may extend from nine to twelve months.

He is seldom mentioned by name in the Talmud—only in nine places. However, all sayings in the Babylonian Talmud introduced by "Yesh omerim" (some say) are ascribed to him.

His chief work was to complete, by additions and amplifications, the compilation of the Talmud begun by Rav Ashi. These additions consisted for the most part of short, explanatory remarks, indispensable for an understanding of Talmudic themes or for deciding between the conflicting opinions of older authorities. According to one theory mentioned above, this activity is the source of his name "Tosafa'ah".
