= Judah b. Meremar =

Judah bar Meremar (or Judah Mar bar Meremar, or Rab Judah;, or Judah b. Amemar, Hebrew: יהודה בר מרימר) was a Babylonian rabbi, of the seventh generation of amoraim.

== Biography ==
He was the son of Maremar, dean of the Sura Yeshiva Academy. His rulings are mentioned in the Talmud, and so are his halakhic habits. For example, he would tell his assistant to hire a laborer to work for him, while committing Judah himself to pay the worker. Since the employer was not same person as the wage payer, there was no danger of accidentally violating the commandment of paying one's workers on time.

He was highly respected by his peers. Once when Rav Papa was marrying his son to the daughter of Abba of Sura, and wanted to visit Abba's house to discuss Abba's dowry payment, Papa met Judah bar Meremar. Papa invited him to come in, but Judah refused, explaining that he did not want Abba of Sura to be ashamed because of him, and therefore would give his daughter more than he truly wished. At Papa's further urging, though, Judah agreed to come. When Abba of Sura stated the dowry's amount, Judah said nothing. Abba thought Judah was silent out of anger that the dowry amount was too small, so he added vast amounts to the dowry. When he saw that Judah was still silent, he said to Judah: "I left myself nothing, and you still want me to give more?" Judah replied: "What you gave is already against my opinion, in my opinion you did not have to give so much, but since you already gave - you should not retract."

Once he ate together with Mar bar Rav Ashi and R. Aha of Difti. Because the three were equal in wisdom, they thought they were exempt from the zimun before birkat hamazon. However, Amemar ruled out they did this in error.
