= Tiqqun soferim =

Term from rabbinic literature

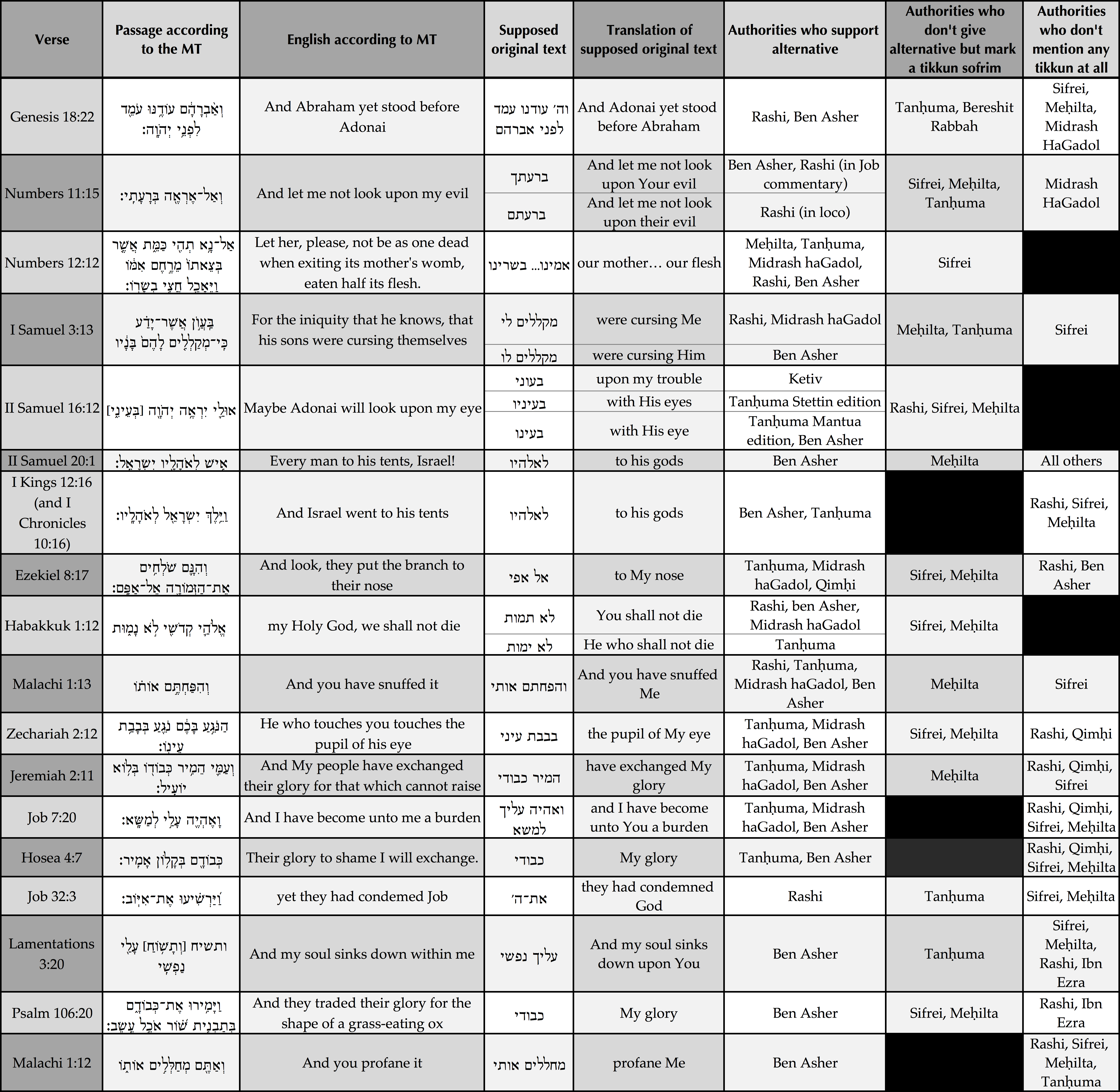
A chart listing 17 examples of tiqqunei sofrim

Tiqqūn sōferīm (Hebrew: תיקון סופרים, plural תיקוני סופרים tiqqūnēi sōferīm) is a term from rabbinic literature meaning "correction/emendation of the scribes" or "scribal correction" and refers to a change of wording in the Tanakh in order to preserve the honor of God or for a similar reason. Today, the phrase Tiqqun Soferim (Note: Alternatively romanized as Tikkun Soferim.) can also refer to a copy of the Five Books of Moses that is used to copy therefrom the Torah scroll.

== History and commentaries ==
The first to use the term tiqqun soferim was Shimon ben Pazi (an amora); previously, the tannaim had used the phrase kina hakatuv ("the verse used a euphemism") in reference to the same verses.

Many traditional commentators (including Elijah Mizrachi, (Note: Commentary to Deuteronomy 28:30.) Rashba, (Note: Shut haRashba (new from manuscript) 368.) and Joseph Albo (Note: Sefer ha-Ikkarim 3:22.)) consider tiqqunei soferim not as actual changes in the text, but rather as meaning that the original author acted like one who corrects a text for reasons of honoring God. On the other hand, modern scholars interpret the words of the old rabbis literally — that the text was corrected by later scribes, perhaps those of the Great Assembly that edited the Biblical corpus. Even among traditional commentators, including the Arukh and Rashi, there are those who believe that the tiqqunei soferim were actual changes that were made (and this seems to be stated explicitly in the Midrash Tanhuma).

== Known examples ==
The rabbis mentioned tiqqunei soferim in several places in their writings, with a total of about 18 tiqqunei soferim in all. However, some modern scholars argue that the rabbis did not give all the cases of tiqqun soferim, and they try to identify other cases.

An example of a tiqqun soferim can be seen in I Kings 21:12–13, where Naboth is accused of cursing God, but the text now has "blessed" since it is not fitting that the name of God should appear after the word "cursed": "Naboth has blessed God and King" instead of "Naboth has cursed God and King".

== See also ==
- Qere and ketiv
- Sofer (scribe)
- Tikkun (book) § Tikkun soferim
