= Sama bar Raqta =

Rav Sama bar Raqta (רב סמא בר רקתא) was a Babylonian Rabbi, of the sixth generation of amoraim.

He was a contemporary of Ravina I, with whom he disputed concerning a halakhah, and to whom he communicated a saying of Rab Awia. He is probably identical with the Rav Sama who sat before Rav Ashi with Ravina.
