= Rabbah Jose =

Rabban Yosi (Hebrew: רבה יוסי, read as Rava Yossi; Also cited as רב יוסף, English: R. Joseph; or רב יוסי, or רבה יוסף, other variations listed below) was a Babylonian rabbi, considered to belong to the eighth generation of amoraim, and to be one of the early savoraim.

== Biography ==
He headed the Pumbedita Academy from the year 476 AD (ד'רל"ו; Hebrew calendar) until he died in 514 AD (ד'רע"ד; Hebrew calendar). He participated in the last stage of the completion process of the arrangement of the Babylonian Talmud, under Ravina II, and under him, the Savora arrangement of the Talmud had started. He was a student of Rabbah Tosafa'ah.

== Alternative names ==
Rabbah Jose is cited under many alternative names, so much so that it is unclear what was his original name. There is even dispute among the scholars whether all the alternative names that are cited in different texts actually refer to the same person or not. The names include:

- Abba Jose (אבא יוסי)
- רבה בר יוסף
- רבי יוסי
- R. Assi (רבי אסי)
- Rabbah (רבה)
- R. Joseph of Be-Hatim (רב יוסף מבי חתים); or Rabbah Joseph of Be-Hatim (רבה יוסף מבי חתים)
