= Rabbi Aibu =

5th c. Israeli rabbi

Rabbi Aibu was a rabbi of the Land of Israel, who lived in the 4th century (fourth generation of amoraim).

He was a contemporary of Judah (Judan) b. Simon (b. Pazzi).

== Teachings ==
Aibu was versed in halakhah, in which he often reported opinions in behalf of Rabbi Yannai, but no original decisions have come down from him. In the field of the aggadah, on the contrary, while we find him repeating observations of his predecessors, his teachings are generally original.

Commenting on Jacob's order to Joseph, "Go and see whether it be well with your brothers and well with the flock", the question is raised, Do flocks of sheep appreciate human greetings? To which Aibu replies: "It is man's duty to pray for and look after the well-being of the dumb animal that contributes to his welfare". In specifying the number of men that escorted Abraham on his journey to Moriah, and Saul on his visit to the witch of En-dor, Scripture, according to R. Aibu, intends to convey the practical lesson, that man when traveling should be accompanied by at least two servants, or else he may himself become his servant's servant.

In his biblical exegesis, he aims to reconcile variations in Scriptural expressions. Thus, Aibu explains the reason assigned for God's mercies in the passage, "The Lord will not forsake his people for his great name's sake", and the omission of that reason in the similar message, "The Lord will not cast off his people", by applying the latter to the times of the people's piety, and the former to the days of heedlessness. God is always good: when the people are deserving of His goodness He showers it upon them for their own sake; when they are undeserving, He forsakes them not for His great name's sake. Similarly, he explains the variation in the version of the Fourth Commandment ("Remember the Sabbath day" versus "Keep the Sabbath day") as follows: the term "remember" applies to cases when one is unable to rest on Shabbat (for instance, on a sea voyage) and only remembering is possible; the term "keep" applies to ordinary circumstances, when "keeping" is obligatory.

Regarding the verse "When I consider thy heavens, the work of thy fingers," etc. Aibu remarks: "There are three classes of men: (1) those who are contented with admiring the grandeur of the sky, with the moon and stars and planets; (2) those who pray to God to reserve all the good due to them for heaven in the hereafter; and (3) a class of lazy workingmen who say, 'Whatever you will give us, give us now, both what may be our due and whatever may be bestowed upon us through our fathers' merits: give us whatever your fingers have wrought'".

Elsewhere he says: "No man departs from this world having realized even half of his desires. When a man has acquired a hundred pieces of gold, he longs to increase them to two hundred; and when he has two hundred, he is anxious to double these again".

Aibu's homiletic observations are numerous, both those related in his own name and those reported in his behalf by the aggadists of his and later generations.
