= Rav Mesharshiya =

Rav Mesharshiya (or R. Mesharshya, or Rav Mesharsheya, or Rav Mesharshia; Hebrew: רב משרשיא) was a Babylonian rabbi, of the fifth generation of amoraim.

== Biography ==
It would appear that "Rav Acha the son of Rav" was his grandfather, making Mesharshiya himself a great-grandson of the great Amora Rav. His father-in-law appears under the name "R. Kahana the father-in-law of R. Mesharshiya".

His principle teacher was Rava, and they are mentioned together dozens of times in the Talmud. It is possible he was also a pupil of Abaye. He was a close colleague of Rav Papa, who was also a pupil of Rava, and he even sent his son to study under Rav Papa. R. Joseph the son of R. Ila'i was also among his colleagues.

Three of his sons became Amora sages. Their names were Raba, R. Sama, and R. Isaac.

It is said that when he died, the palm trees became full of thorns in place of dates, as a sign of mourning.
