= Me'asha (amora) =

Me'asha (מיישא) was a rabbi in the Land of Israel of the fourth century CE (third generation of amoraim).

He is mentioned as a companion of Samuel bar Isaac and Zeira. His halakhic and aggadic teachings appear in both Talmudim.

== See also ==
- Me'asha (disambiguation)
