= Abba of Jaffa =

Amora living in Jaffa

Abba of Jaffa (Jewish Palestinian Aramaic: אַבָּא דְּמִן יָפוֹ, romanized: Abba d'min Yafo) or Adda of Jaffa (אדא דמן יפו Adda d'min Yafo) was an amora who lived in Jaffa. He is best known for his teaching that the 10 sons of Haman should be read in one breath during the recitation of the Book of Esther on Purim. Ḥiyya was his son according to the Jerusalem Talmud and his grandson according to Genesis Rabbah.
