= Rav Yemar =

Babylonian rabbi

Rav Yemar (or Rav Yeimar or Rav Jemar; Hebrew: רב יימר) was a Babylonian rabbi, of the sixth and seventh generations of amoraim.

According to Sherira Gaon, he filled the place of Rav Ashi as head of the Sura Academy for five years (427-432).
