= Rabbi Simon =

Rabbi Simon can refer to:

- Rabbi Shimon bar Yochai, a tanna
- Rabbi Shimon ben Pazi, an amora, often called Rabbi Simon (רבי סימון) in the Jerusalem Talmud
