= Rav Kahana III =

Babylonian rabbi

For other Amoraic sages of Babylonia with the name "Rav Kahana", see Rav Kahana.

Rav Kahana (III) (Hebrew: רב כהנא מפום נהרא, read as Rav Kahana Me-Pum-Nahara, lit. "Rabbi Kahana of Pum-Nahara"; appearing in the Talmud merely as Rav Kahana) was a Babylonian rabbi, of the third and fourth generation of amoraim, who headed the Yeshiva of Pum-Nahara.

== Biography ==
During his youth he studied under Judah ben Ezekiel, and after his death, he served at Rabbah bar Nahmani as well, and learned under him tractate Sanhedrin along with his great friend Rav Safra. He made Aliyah to the Land of Israel along with Safra, and studied under Rabbi Zeira and Rabbi Abbahu. He also studied under Rabbi Hiyya bar Abba, who also prayed for his longevity, and indeed his blessing materialized.

After a while he returned to Babylonia, and then fixed his residence at Pum-Nahara, where he studied with Rav Ashi, who became his leading student. Ashi honored Kahana greatly, but considered Amemar to be his principal Rabbi as well. Ashi would use the honorary title 'Mar' ("Sir") towards Amemar, but only when Kahana was not present.

He was a colleague of Rav Nachman bar Yitzchak, and together they rebuked the rich individuals who interfered with the appointment of religious judges and community leaders.

He was a Kohen, from Eli ha-Kohen's family.

Kahana's Yeshiva in Pum-Nahara was subordinated to the yeshiva in Sura, but from the times of Rava's death and onward, the heads of the Yeshiva in Nehardea would frequently visit Rav Kahana III in Pum-Nahara, most likely for the purpose of reinforcing their yeshiva's influence over the yeshiva in Pum-Nahara. This reinforcement of ties, between Nehardea and Pum-Nahara, is attested by the fact that Kahana III gave his funeral oration to Rav Zevid of Nehardea at Pum-Nahara.
