= Ketib =

Ketib is a transcription of various words in Semitic languages, and may refer to:

- Qere and Ketiv, in Hebrew textual criticism
- Katib or secretary, a position in Arabic-speaking monarchies
