= Samuel bar Isaac =

Rabbi from the third generation of amoraim

Rav Shmuel bar Rav Yitzchak
- שמואל בר רב יצחק
- Born: Babylonia
- Died: Land of Israel
- Other names: Samuel bar Isaac
- Occupations: Rabbi, Talmudist
- Known for: Leading rabbi of the third generation of amoraim

Rav Shmuel bar Rav Yitzchak, or Samuel bar Isaac, was a rabbi from the third generation of amoraim (290-320 CE). He lived in Babylonia and eventually moved to the Land of Israel. Along with Rabbi Zeira, he was considered one of the greatest rabbis in the Land of Israel.

== Biography ==
He was born in Babylonia to a Rav Yitzchak, who the Talmud gives the name "father of Rav Shmuel bar Rav Yitzchak". In his youth he learned under Rav, but was considered the greatest student of Rav Huna. After becoming established as a talmid chacham, he moved to the land of Israel, where he learned from R. Hiyya bar Abba. He became so close to Hiyya that when Hiyya died, Samuel practiced the mourning rites which are generally reserved for a close family member (later, when Samuel died, Rabbi Zeira did the same for him). Eventually Samuel became known as the greatest rabbi of his generation. His son-in-law was Rabbi Hoshaiah II.

He was accustomed to entertain the bride and groom at weddings by dancing before them with myrtle-branches. Some rabbis, including Rabbi Zeira, considered this to be embarrassingly frivolous for someone of Samuel's stature. But according to tradition, his conduct received Divine approval: When he died, a bath kol announced that "Rav Samuel bar Rav Yitzchak, the man who did kindness, has died"; at his funeral, fire descended from heaven in the form of myrtle-poles to separate the mourners from his body; and all the trees of the Land of Israel were uprooted, indicating that they had missed the chance to be taken by Samuel for his wedding-dances.

== Teachings ==
He ruled that the valid location on the head for placing tefillin is large enough to contain two pairs of head-tefillin.
