= Abba bar Hiyya bar Abba =

Abba bar Hiyya b. Abba was a Jewish rabbi who flourished at the beginning of the fourth century CE (fourth generation of amoraim). He was the son of Hiyya bar Abba, the well-known pupil of Johanan, and transmitted to his generation the sayings of Johanan, which in their turn had been delivered to him by his father. He was on terms of intimate friendship with Rabbi Zeira.
