= Rav Kahana =

Rav Kahana, a name alluding to several Babylonian amoraim, may refer to:

- Rav Kahana I
- Rav Kahana II
- Rav Kahana III
- Rav Kahana IV
