= Anani ben Sason =

Jewish Talmudist of the 3rd century CE

Rabbi Anani ben Sason (Hebrew: רבי ענני בר ששון; also called 'Anani, 'Inani, and 'Inyani) was a Jewish Talmudist who lived in the Land of Israel in the third century (third generation of amoraim).

== Teachings ==
He was a contemporary of Rabbi Ammi. He rarely discussed Halakhot, and his discussions of them were not original. Once he recited a Halakhah in the patriarch's mansion, without naming its author, which provoked Ammi to ask: "Is it his own? It is what Rabbi Eleazar had reported in the name of Rabbi Oshaiah".

In aggadah, he sometimes reported the sayings of others, but more often he was original. Thus, to explain the juxtaposition of the laws of sacrifice and priestly vestments, he argues that the priestly vestments were to provide atonement just as the sacrifices do. He represents the miter as atoning for haughtiness, and cites R. Chanina as saying, "That which rests highest on the priest atones for one's considering himself high"; and similarly with the rest of the priestly garments.

Referring to God's appearance in the burning bush he remarks, "The Holy One—blessed be He!—said to Moses, 'When I will it, one of my angels stretches forth his hand from heaven and reaches to the ground,' as Scripture says, 'He put forth the form of a hand, and took me by a lock of my head'; and when it so pleases me, I make three angels sit under one tree; when I choose, my glory fills the universe, as it is written, 'Do I not fill heaven and earth? says the Lord'; and when I so willed, I spoke to Job in a whirlwind, as it is said "The Lord answered Job out of the whirlwind"".

The same idea, though in different form, is found elsewhere in the name of R. Chanina b. Issi (Sissi). As the name of the subject of this article is sometimes written 'Inani and also 'Inyani—which forms are dialectic variations of Chanina, though with the initial aleph instead of ayin—the circumstance probably suggested the identity of the two names. But this identification meets with insuperable chronological difficulties, Chanina b. Sissi being a contemporary of Johanan, while 'Anani was younger even than Johanan's pupils.

Isaac Reichlin aptly suggests that Anani's real name was Ananiel, as it is still preserved in Exodus Rabbah 3:7, and that its apocopated form was adopted to avoid the mention of the name "El" (God) in common speech.
