= Maremar =

Maremar (Hebrew: מרימר) was a Babylonian rabbi, of the sixth generation of amoraim (late 4th-early 5th centuries).

== Biography ==
He was close to Mar Zutra. They constructed synagogues together, would both give sermons following the shacharit prayer on Shabbat, and would both rely on someone supporting them to ensure they recited kiddush levana while standing. He was also friends with Ravina I, and they are mentioned together in many halachic contexts.

Once a man left Maremar's house having received a halachic ruling. Rav Aha b. Raba was outside at the time and asked which ruling he had received. Aha considered the answer to be wrong, so he sent the man back inside to hear the ruling again. When asked again, Maremar gave the same answer, and added an explanation for the benefit of whoever had questioned the original ruling.

Other sages deduced a number of laws from their observations of Maremar's behavior.

His son, Judah b. Meremar, also became a renowned scholar.

He was an Amora - Rabbi in the time period of the Gemara
