= Rav Shmuel bar Yehudah =

Babylonian amora

Rav Shmuel bar Yehudah (Hebrew: רַב שְׁמוּאֵל בַּר יְהוּדָה, lit. 'Great Samuel, son of Judah') was a Babylonian amora of the third generation.

== Biography ==
He was born to a family of converts, and studied under Rabbi Judah bar Ezekiel in Babylonia. Judah said of him that he relied on Shmuel for all matters.

He eventually traveled to the land of Israel to study under Rabbi Yochanan and Rabbi Eleazar in Tiberias, after which he returned to Babylonia, bringing many teachings of the Amoraim of Israel to Babylonia, particularly those of Rabbi Yochanan. It is mentioned that he also learnt from Rabbi Zeira and Samuel bar Isaac, and in the name of Abba. The Amora Abaye also learned matters of Halachah with him.

His daughter died in his lifetime, and the sages, including Ulla came to console him.
