= Hoshaiah II =

Rabbi (died ca. 350)

Hoshaiah or Oshaya (Also spelled: Oshaia; Jewish Babylonian Aramaic: אושעיא, Hebrew: הושעיה; died ca. 350 CE) was an amora of the 3rd and 4th generations in Rabbinic Judaism.

== Biography ==
Hoshaiah was born in Babylonia and later moved to the Land of Israel along with his colleague Hanina. The two were brothers according to Sanhedrin 14a; see Maharsha, Ḥiddushe Agadot, ad loc. They were lineal descendants from Eli the priest, which circumstance they assigned as reason for Johanan bar Nappaha's failure to ordain them. To make a living, they were shoemakers.

The Talmud in Sanhedrin 67b, when dealing with the laws differentiating magic as illusion and as wizardry, refers to Hoshaiah and Hanina as rabbis, stating that the two of them produced magic while occupying themselves with the "laws of Yetzirah. Hoshaiah and Hanina are also mentioned in connection with a thermae, the ownership of which was contested by two persons, one of whom turned over the property as heqdesh (for sacred use), causing Hoshaiah, Hanina, and other rabbis to leave it according to Bava Metziah 6b.

According to the Jerusalem Talmud in Avodah Zarah, Chapter 3, page 42c, on the day Hoshaiah died, the largest date palm in Tiberias was uprooted and fell.

== Modern figures by this name ==
Since the late twentieth century, a Jewish illusionist has performed under the name Oshaya the Seer, inspired by the famous amora known for his association with the magical arts. By late 2023, an artists’ collective had emerged from the work of this conjurer.
