= Me'asha ben Joseph =

Work hard is the best policy

Me'asha ben Joseph (?) was an aggadist and mystic; grandson and pupil of Joshua ben Levi From the few details concerning him it appears that on Shabbat he used to have himself carried to the synagogue in order to preach, that he was not rich, and that he died suddenly in the time of Rabbi Ammi. Me'asha is particularly noted for the vision which he is reported to have seen during a trance lasting three days, and concerning which he said: "I have been in a world of confusion where people who are honored here are held in contempt". In Pesach 50a this vision is ascribed to Joseph ben Joshua ben Levi; Joseph was probably Me'asha's father. Me'asha inferred from Isaiah 33:15-17 that when one shuts his eyes to things indecent he is worthy to view the face of the Shekhinah.

== See also ==
- Me'asha (disambiguation)
