= Mata Mehasya =

- מתא מחסיא (Imperial Aramaic)
- Type: Town
- Location: Southern Babylonia
- Region: Near Sura
- Home to the Sura Academy in classical antiquity

Mata Mehasya (Imperial Aramaic: מתא מחסיא) was a town in southern Babylonia near Sura, home to Sura Academy in classical antiquity.

== Location ==
Sherira Gaon regarded Sura and Mata Mehasya as identical, for in his accounts of the geonim of Sura he uses the names of both Mata Mehasya (or Meḥasya) and Sura to indicate the seat of the academy, the former name even being the more frequent of the two. In the passage where he describes the founding of the Academy of Sura by Rav, he says expressly that Rav had come to "Sura, which is Mata Mehasya" There is no doubt, however, that these names belonged to two distinct towns, which came to be regarded as one when the seat of the academy was mentioned. They are named together in Berachot 29a, where the different modes of speech of the peoples of the two places are noted. Other Talmudic passages clearly indicate that these were two different towns. Sherira Gaon himself says (1:30) that in the second half of the third century Ḥuna's school (by implication the academy founded by Rav) was in the vicinity of Mata Mehasya; Rav's colleague Rav Chisda lived at Sura. It seems likely, therefore, that the school was situated between the two places.

== History ==
When the academy entered upon a new period of prosperity, under Rav Ashi, in the late 4th century, its seat was at Mata Mehasya, where Ashi lived. Most of the Talmudic references to this place, which Ashi says may not be called either a city or a borough, date from this time. Ashi refers to its synagogue, which strangers visited on his account, and he claims to have saved the town from destruction by prohibiting the construction of houses higher than the synagogue. Ashi was wont to say that the non-Jewish inhabitants of Mata Mehasya were hard-hearted, since they beheld the splendor of the Torah twice a year at the great Kallah assemblies, and yet not one of them was converted to Judaism.

Halevy assumes that Sura again became the seat of the academy after Ashi's death, and that Mar bar Rav Ashi restored Mata Mehasya to the position to which Ashi had raised it. From his time probably dates the maxim which the martyr Mashershaya gave his sons, contrasting the outward poverty of Mata Mehasya with the splendor of Pumbedita: "Live on the dung-heaps of Mata Mehasya and not in the palaces of Pumbedita!" There were various differences of opinion between the scholars of Pumbedita and Mata Mehasya regarding questions of civil law. Ravina, the last amora of the Academy of Sura, lived at Mata Mehasya. The Talmud refers to the destruction of Mata Mehasya, but in post-Talmudic times the town lent its name to the Academy of Sura, as stated above.

== See also ==
- History of the Jews in Iraq
- Talmudic Academies in Babylonia
