= Hama bar Bisa =

3rd-century rabbi

Hama bar Bisa (Hebrew: חמא בר ביסא) was an amora (Talmud rabbi) of the third century, who formed the middle link of a scholarly trio, and who exceeded his predecessor, as his successor in turn exceeded him, in the acquisition of knowledge.

== Life ==
Like many other students, he left home and family, being gone twelve years. When he returned, fearing to startle his family, he went first to the local beth midrash, whence he sent word to them of his arrival. While there, his young son Oshaiah soon engaged him in a discussion, neither knowing the other. Hama, admiring the logical bent of the young man's mind, sorrowfully reflected on his long absence from home, where he himself might have raised such a son. He at last went to his house, and there, he saw his late interlocutor at the beth midrash enter. Surmising that he had come to continue the discussion, Hama rose to receive him, whereupon his wife surprised him by exclaiming, "Does a father ever rise before a son?" (Ketubot 62b). On another occasion father and son were discussing a point of civil law. They disagreed and submitted their views to Bisa, the father of Ḥama, who sided with Oshaiah. On this occasion Rami bar Hama expressed the hope that in the learned trio would be fulfilled the Scriptural saying (Ecclesiastes 4:12), "A threefold cord is not quickly broken" (Bava Batra 59a).

According to the tosafists (Bava Batra 59a, s.v. "והחוט"), the Oshaiah here cited is identical with Hoshaiah Rabbah. Wilhelm Bacher ("Die Agada der palästinensischen Amoräer" i. 89) adopts this view, but Zecharias Frankel ("Mebo Yerushalmi," p. 85b) questions its tenability. There is no doubt that Hoshaiah Rabbah's father's name was "Hama," but it is cited with the addition of "father of Rabbi Hoshaiah" (Jerusalem Talmud, Shevi'it ii. 33d; Jerusalem Talmud, Niddah iii. 50c). Only once does the name "Hama bar Bisa" appear so as to leave no doubt of his being a contemporary of Judah ha-Nasi, and, therefore, the father of Hoshaiah Rabbah (Niddah 14b). But the patronymic is an error, and the parallel passage reads correctly: "Hama, the father of Hoshaiah" (Jerusalem Talmud, Niddah ii. 49d). It is probable that Hama was the father of the younger Hoshaiah, and flourished contemporaneously with Rami bar Hama, the son-in-law of Rav Chisda.
