= Darshan (Judaism) =

A darshan (Hebrew: דַּרְשָׁן) or baal darshan (Hebrew: בַּעַל־דַּרְשָׁן) is a Jewish scriptural interpreter. Since the Middle Ages, it has referred to a professional sermonizer more broadly. The title was given to Abtalion and Shemaiah in the 1st century BCE.

Since the 1990s, some branches of non-Orthodox Judaism have ordained lay leaders and chaplains as darshanim.

== See also ==
- Maggid
- Moshe ha-Darshan
