= Me'asha =

Me'asha was the name of three important rabbis of the Mishnaic and Talmudic periods.

1. Me'asha, tanna to whom one reference occurs in the Mishnah (Peah 2:6), from which it appears that he lived in the time of Hillel's descendants (compare Heilprin, "Seder ha-Dorot," ii.).
2. Me'asha ben Joseph (?), an aggadist and mystic who died in the time of Rabbi Ammi
3. Me'asha (amora), an amora in the Land of Israel of the fourth century CE
