= Shila of Kefar Tamarta =

Rabbi Shila of Kefar Tamarta (Hebrew: שילא איש כפר תמרתא) was a Jewish Talmudist from the Land of Israel, who lived in the 3rd century (third generation of amoraim).

In the Jerusalem Talmud he is usually called by his personal name, but in the Babylonian Talmud the name of his home in Judea is always added, in order to distinguish him from an older Babylonian amora who bore the same name.

Shila was accustomed to deliver public aggadic lectures, and he is mentioned only in connection with aggadah; yet he seems to have been active in halakhah also, although no halakhic sayings of his have been preserved. Most of his surviving Biblical exegesis is taken from these discourses, each of which is prefaced by the formula: "R. Shila has preached". Other aggadot of his are found in Midrash Tehillim to Psalms 80:7, and Tanhuma, Mishpaṭim, 8 (ed. Buber, p. 43a).
