= Ravina II =

Late 5th-century rabbi and redactor of the Talmud

Ravina II or Rabina II (Hebrew: אבינא בריה דרב הונא or רבינא האחרון; died 475 CE or 499/500 CE) was a Babylonian rabbi of the 5th century (seventh and eighth generations of amoraim). Rabina is a traditional portmanteau of the title Rav and the personal name Abina, a form of the Aramaic word for "father" (compare Abuna, Abaye, Abin, Abahu, Abba, Rava, Rabin).

The Talmud says that "Ravina" and Rav Ashi were "the end of instruction", which is traditionally interpreted to mean that the two were responsible for redacting the Babylonian Talmud. Most scholars agree that this "Ravina" was Ravina II, the son of Huna bar Abin HaKohen, and not Ravina I, the colleague of Rav Ashi who died before him.

== Biography ==
He did not remember his father Huna, who died while Ravina was still a child, but the Talmud states several times that his mother communicated to him the opinions held by his father. After his father's death, his maternal uncle Ravina I became his guardian.

Ravina II officiated as judge at Sura shortly after Rav Ashi's death, and was a colleague of Mar bar Rav Ashi, although he was not so prominent. After Rabbah Tosafa'ah's death, Ravina became, for a year (474), director of the Sura Academy. Simultaneously, Rabbah Jose served as head of the Pumbedita academy. Ravina served as leader of the Jewish community in Babylonia for 22 years. One year before his death, all the Babylonian synagogues were closed, and Jewish infants were handed over to the Magians. He died on the 13th of Kislev in 474/475 or 499/500 CE.
