= Rabbi Yannai =

3rd century Jewish amora

Rabbi Yannai (or Rabbi Jannai; Hebrew: רבי ינאי) was an amora who lived in the 3rd century, and of the first generation of the Amoraim of the Land of Israel.

== Biography ==
Genesis Rabbah says he is descended from Eli the priest. He was very wealthy; he is said to have planted four hundred vineyards (though they may have been small vineyards) and to have given an orchard to the public. His first residence was at Sepphoris, where he seems to have held a public office, since at the death of R. Judah ha-Nasi he gave an order that even priests might attend Judah's funeral. Halevy, however, has concluded that Yannai always lived at 'Akbara, or 'Akbari, where he established a school (see below).

He was a student of R. Judah haNasi, in whose name he transmitted several halakhic sayings. The best known of his senior fellow students was Hiyya the Great, who, as an assistant teacher in Rabbi's school, sometimes acted as Yannai's tutor. But several discussions between Hiyya and Yannai show the real relationship. Their friendship was afterward cemented by the marriage of Yannai's daughter to Hiyya's son Judah. Yannai transmitted also some halakhot in the name of the council ("haburah") of the last tannaim. He established an important school at 'Akbara, often mentioned in both Talmuds and in the Midrash as the "debei R. Yannai" or the "beit R. Yannai," and which continued after his death. His school differed from others in that the pupils were treated as belonging to the master's family; they worked on Yannai's estate, took their share of the revenue, and lived under his roof. His chief pupil, of whom he thought highly, was Rabbi Yochanan, who transmitted most of his halakhot. Others of his many pupils were Simeon ben Lakish, Rabbi Aibu and R. Hoshaiah Rabbah.

== Teachings ==
Yannai was prominent both as halakhist and aggadist. His name is mentioned in the Babylonian Talmud 176 times, and in the Jerusalem Talmud 254 times.

He shared Hiyya's opinion regarding to the Mishnah; he granted it no greater authority than to the collections of halakhot or baraitot compiled by Hiyya and other disciples of Judah haNasi. When his pupil R. Johanan remarked that the Mishnah rendered a decision different from his, he answered, "The Mishnah gives only the decision of a single tanna, while I decide conformably to the Rabbis as a whole". He was independent in his decisions, and sometimes had all his contemporaries against him. His decisions were generally rigid regarding individuals, but liberal when the whole community was concerned. Yannai's disregard of R. Judah Nesi'ah, Rabbi's grandson, was notorious, and so was his attitude toward Hanina bar Hama, an ardent believer in Rabbi's Mishnah. Yannai said in reference to Hanina, "He who studies the Law under only one teacher sees no sign of blessing".

Yannai is conspicuous in both Talmud and Midrash as a prolific aggadist, and he occupies an important place among the Biblical exegetes of his time. In reference to a man who studied much but did not fear God, he said: "Woe to the man who, before he gets a house, makes the door". He recommended submission to the government. When old age had impaired his sight he requested Mar Ukba to send him some eye-salves prepared by Samuel. He enjoined his children to bury him neither in white nor in black clothes, as they would not know whether his place would be in paradise or in hell.
