= Abba b. Bizna =

Abba b. Bizna was a Jewish Amora (scholar) of the fourth century, who is occasionally mentioned as a haggadist, and as having handed down certain halakic opinions.
