= Ravina I =

Babylonian rabbi (died c. 420)

Ravina I (Hebrew: רבינא; died c. CE 420) was a Babylonian Jewish Talmudist and rabbi, of the 5th and 6th generation of amoraim.

== Biography ==
His father seems to have died before he was born or at an early age, and it was necessary for his mother to inform him of some of his father's halachic practices. He was a pupil of Rava bar Joseph bar Hama, and his extreme youthfulness at that time is shown by the fact that his teacher designated him and Hama bar Bisa as "dardeki" (children). He frequently addressed questions to Rava, whose sayings he cites.

At an early age Ravina was recognized as a teacher, leaving the academy at Mahoza while Rava was still living. Wherever he lived he was recognized as a teacher and judge, and was called upon to render independent decisions. Ravina was on friendly terms with Rav Nachman bar Yitzchak, and was a colleague of Rav Aha b. Rava, with whom he had many disputations on legal questions, Ravina being inclined to lenience and Aha to stringency. Ravina's decisions always prevailed, with the exception of three cases in which, contrary to his custom, he advocated stringency. When Rav Ashi became director of the Academy of Sura (or Mata Mehasya), Ravina became a student there, although he was at least as old as Ashi—perhaps even a few years older; however, he was the associate of Ashi ("talmid haver") rather than his student. Ravina died seven years before Ashi.

== Compilation of the Talmud ==
Ravina began the process of compiling the Babylonian Talmud with Rav Ashi. However, opinions differ on whether the Ravina responsible was this Ravina, or his nephew Ravina II. Besides Ashi, Ravina had the greatest share in the redaction of the Talmud undertaken by Ashi and his colleagues.
