= Ammi b. Abba =

Rammi bar Abba (= an abbreviation of R. Ammi bar Abba), or Rammi bar Abba I, was a third generation Amora sage of Babylonia.

He cites the teachings of Rav Huna, who was probably his teacher. He had many aggadic teachings.

He transmitted to his generation many enactments of R. Jose ben Halafta in Sepphoris, among them:

- A woman shall not walk in the street while her son is behind her, owing to an incident that once happened, when immoral men kidnapped a child which was following his mother, and she was searching for him, then they lured her into a house, telling her he was there, and there assaulted her.
- Women while in the closet should talk to one another for the sake of privacy from the intrusion of men, which is illegal due to the prohibition of Yichud.
