= Hiyya bar Abba =

3rd century Jewish amoraic sage

- חייא בר אבא

Personal life
- Born: 3rd century
- Died: 4th century Babylonia
- Parent: Abba (father)
- Era: Third generation of amoraim

Religious life
- Religion: Judaism

Jewish leader
- Teacher: Samuel of Nehardea, Johanan bar Nappaha

Ḥiyya bar Abba (Jewish Babylonian Aramaic: רבי חייא בר אבא), Ḥiyya bar Ba (רבי חייא בר בא), or Ḥiyya bar Wa (רבי חייא בר ווא) was a third-generation amoraic sage of the Land of Israel, of priestly descent, who flourished at the end of the third century.

== Biography ==
In both Talmuds he is frequently called merely R. Hiyya. He may have briefly studied with Samuel of Nehardea in Mesopotamia, called "Babylon" in Jewish texts, his native land. When he was still very young, Hiyya migrated to Israel where he studied under Hanina and Joshua ben Levi. He may also have been influenced by Shimon ben Lakish. Hiyya was also a student of Johanan bar Nappaha. After Rabbi Johanan's death, Hiyya and his friends Rabbi Ammi and Rav Assi became recognized as some of Israel's brightest halakhic scholars.

Hiyya was distinguished for the care with which he noted the sayings of his masters. When questions arose about being faithful to tradition, Hiyya's interpretation was widely accepted. Though he was the author of many aggadot, he denounced every attempt to collect and commit his tales to writing. Whenever he came upon such a collection, Hiyya cursed the hand that wrote it. His focus was squarely on Halakha.

The Jerusalem Talmud relates that when the Roman emperor Diocletian visited Tyre, Hiyya went so far as to "trample over graves" to go out and see him.

With the help of Ammi and Assi, Hiyya formed a court of law. One day a woman named Tamar came before the court. Her case was a difficult one. The sentence handed down was controversial; Hiyya and his associates might have suffered disastrous consequences if Abbahu himself had not come to their assistance.

Hiyya was forced to lecture from town to town in an effort to make ends meet. He even had to leave Israel temporarily. During these travels, when another lecturer on aggadah drew a bigger crowd than he did, Hiyya couldn't hide his annoyance. To improve his circumstances, Hiyya accepted a commission from Judah II to collect money to help rebuild the decaying patriarchate.

The esteem in which Hiyya was held is evident in a letter of introduction Eleazar ben Pedath provided for him: "Behold, we have sent you a great man, our envoy. Until his return he possesses all the powers that we do." According to another version, the introduction read: "Behold, we have sent you a great man. His greatness consists in this, that he is not ashamed to say 'I know not'."

Hiyya, Ammi, and Assi visited various communities in Israel at the behest of Judah II who entrusted them with reawakening interest in the study of Jewish Law.

Hiyya had several brothers: Nathan ha-Kohen, also known as Kohen (or Nathan) b. Abba; Bannai; and Simeon ben Abba. He had several children, including Abba, Kahana, and Nehemiah.
