= Tikkun (book) =

Book used to prepare for reading or writing a Torah scroll

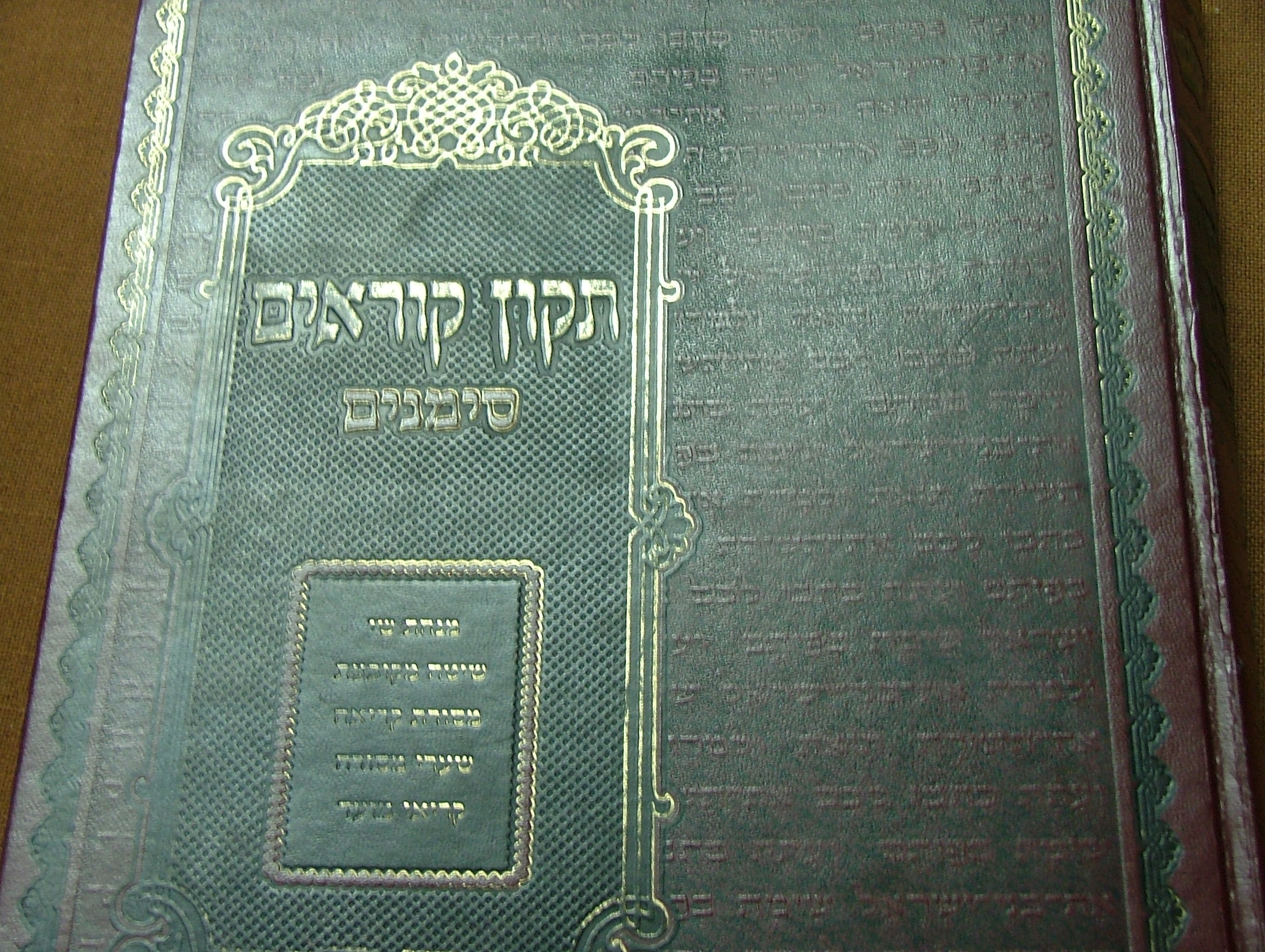
A tikkun kor'im

A tikkun or tiqqun (Hebrew: תיקון) is a book used by Jews to prepare for reading or writing a Torah scroll. There are two types of tikkun, a tikkun qorʾim "reader's tikkun" and a tikkun soferim "scribe's tikkun".

== Tikkun qor'im ==
Page from a tikkun

A tiqqun qorʾim "readers' tikkun" is a study guide used when preparing a Torah reading for a synagogue. Each tikkun contains two renditions of the Masoretic Text. The right side of each page is written with the niqqud (vowel marks) and Hebrew cantillation, while the left is written in unpointed Hebrew as it appears in a Torah scroll. Reciters must master the tune ("trope," Hebrew: טעמי המקרא, romanized: taʿamē hammiqrā) and pronunciation of the words beforehand because a Torah scroll itself has neither niqqud nor cantillation marks and because there are places where the word to be read differs from that written in the scroll (the Qere and Ketiv).

== Tikkun soferim ==
A tiqqun soferim (scribes' tikkun) is similar but is designed as a guide or model text for scribes. It contains additional information of use to scribes, such as directions concerning writing particular words, traditions of calligraphic ornamentation, and information about spacing and justification. For instance, it indicates how many letters there are per line, measured in yodh-widths because it is the smallest Hebrew letter.

== Resources ==
- The Kestenbaum Edition Tikkun: The Torah Reader's Compendium (2001) (ISBN 1-57819-313-3) – Complete tikkun with pointed Hebrew, unpointed Hebrew, plus English translation and commentary.
- Tanakh on Demand – On-line PDF's in Hebrew of any Torah section, including option for tikkun format.
- Navigating the Bible II – Online version of the Hebrew Bible, including tikkun format of a few verses at a time, and audio of cantillation.
- ScrollScraper – An online tikkun for an arbitrary excerpt of Torah verses, leveraging the bible.ort.org infrastructure.
- Mechon Mamre – Innovative online 'tikkun', with vowels and cantillation appearing and disappearing with a mouse rollover.
