= Abba the Surgeon =

- Occupation: Surgeon
- Era: Talmudic era
- Known for: Example of genuine Jewish piety and benevolence
- Notable work: Story in the Talmud (Ta'anit, 21b et seq.)

Abba the Surgeon is a figure mentioned in the Talmud as an example of genuine Jewish piety and benevolence (Ta'anit, 21b et seq.) Although dependent upon his earnings, he was so unselfish and considerate that, in order to avoid embarrassing the poor among his patients, he would never accept pay directly from any one, but instead attached to a certain part of his house a box into which each patient might place what he pleased.

According to the story, Abaye, 280 -339, the great Talmudic authority of the time, sent two young disciples to test him. Having lodged with him they took in the morning the bedding on which they had slept and went to the market. When Abba passed by they asked him to estimate the bedding's worth. He quoted them a price and, being asked whether the value might be higher, he said: this is what I paid for it. Then they told him that indeed they had taken the bedding from him and asked what he suspected them of. He explained that he had thought that they needed the money urgently for charity—the redemption of prisoners—and were too shy to ask him. Being offered to take back his property he refused, saying that he had already dedicated it for charity. Of Abba the legend is told (Talmud, l.c.) that he daily received greetings from heaven, whereas Abaye was deemed worthy of divine notice once a week only.
