= Semikhah =

Ordination of a rabbi or cantor in Judaism

Semikhah (Note: Also semichah, smicha, semicha, smikha, semikha) (Hebrew: סְמִיכָה) is the traditional term for rabbinic ordination in Judaism.

The original semikhah tradition is that of the formal "transmission of authority" from Moses to Joshua described in Numbers 27:23; the Talmud records Chazal debating the process in tractate Sanhedrin 13b. This form of semikha ceased between 360 and 425 CE. Since then, semikhah has continued less formally; throughout Jewish history, there have been several attempts to reestablish the classical semikhah.

The title of "rabbi" has "proliferated greatly over the last century". Nowadays, semikhah is also granted for a comparatively limited form of ordination, bestowing the authority to apply Halakha in specific Jewish settings rather than across the Jewish people writ large. In Jewish religious movements other than Orthodox Judaism, rabbinical education often emphasizes the modern roles of rabbis, such as preaching, teaching, counseling, and pastoral work.

In recent times, relatedly, some institutions grant ordination for the role of hazzan (cantor), extending the "investiture" granted there from the 1950s. Less commonly, since the 1990s, ordination is given for the role of lay leader—sometimes titled darshan. Ordination may then also be specifically termed סמיכה לרבנות ('rabbinical ordination'), סמיכה לחזנות ('cantorial ordination'), or הסמכת מגיד ('maggidic ordination').

== Etymology and related terminology ==
The word semikhah derives from a Hebrew root סמכ (smk) that means to "rely on", in the sense of "lean on", or "to be authorized"; the literal meaning of semikhah is "leaning [of the hands]". Semikhah may refer to the "conferring" of the ordination, or as a noun, to the certification itself, where the plural is Semakhot (or Semachot); one with ordination may then be referred to as a Musmach. A precedent Biblical usage is Numbers 8:10, describing the preparation of the Levites for service.

A rabbi is also sometimes referred to as a Moreh Hora'ah (מורה הוראה) "one who teaches [Halakhic] decisions", while the ordination itself is called Heter Hora'ah (היתר הוראה) "permission to make Halakhic decisions", certifying that the holder has the facility to apply his "thorough knowledge of the Talmud" to the facts of a given halakhic question, and (implicitly) certifies also that the candidate is suitable to function as a community rabbi. These terms derive from Leviticus 10:11, where the requirement is specified that halakhic decisions are to be made only by a qualified authority.

== Concept ==
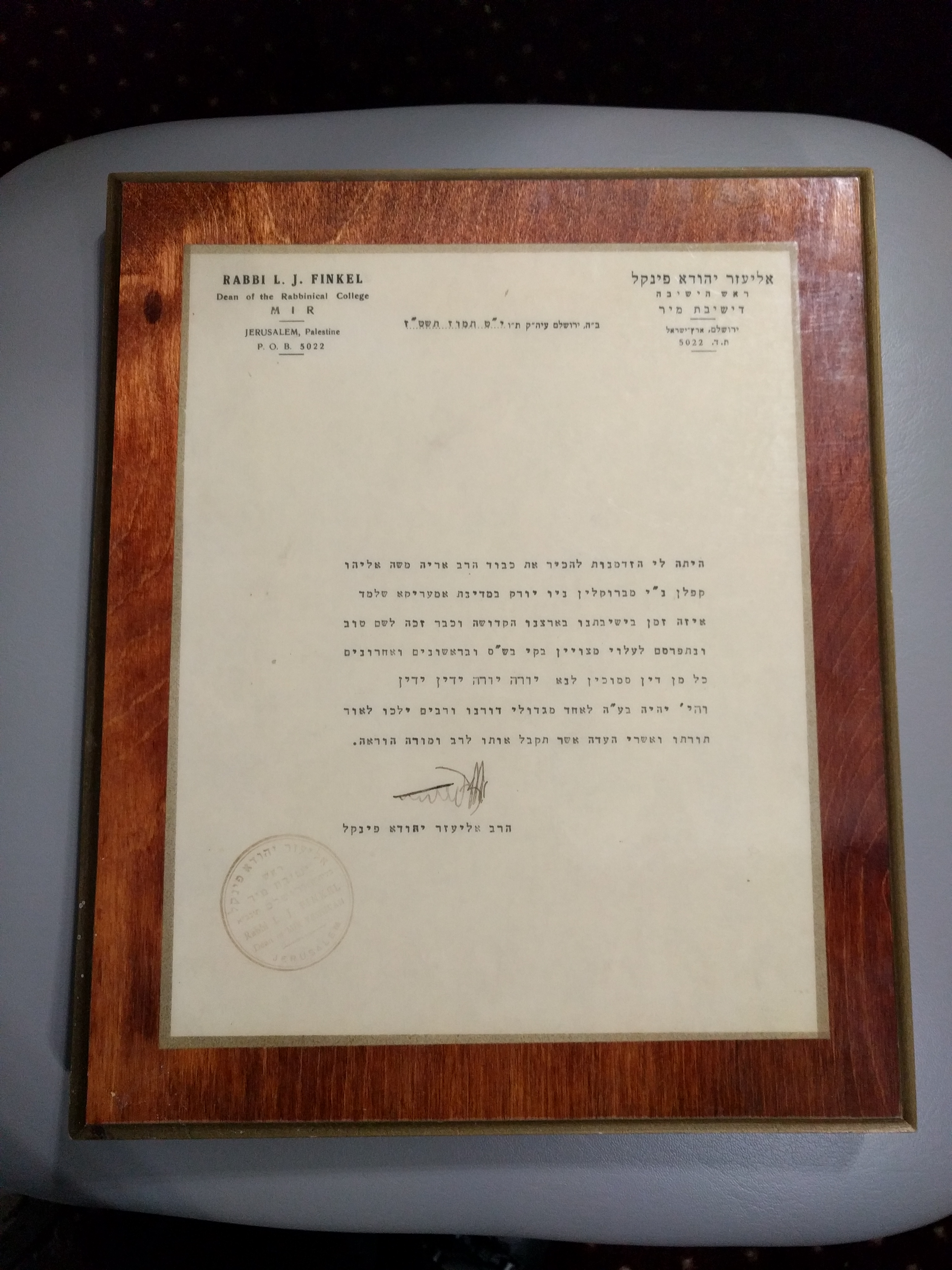
Semikhah certificate of Rabbi Aryeh Kaplan awarded by Rabbi Eliezer Yehuda Finkel. The document states that the holder is learned in Shas (ש״ס) as well as in Rishonim and Acharonim, respectively confirming wide knowledge of Talmud and deep knowledge of Halakha. The phrase here "כל מן דין סמוכין לנא" "anyone (i.e. only one) of this [caliber] may be ordained for us" is often included.

In concept, semikhah represents a "bond" dating back to the time of Moses and Joshua. It is held that God taught the Torah to Moses on Mount Sinai in 1312 BCE and that since that time, the knowledge of the Torah has been passed from generation to generation by the conferment of semikhah, rabbinic ordination, or the unbroken transmission of authority dating back to that time. This unbroken chain of Torah teaching is thus said to have continued for over 3300 years and continues to this day.

The ancient formula for semikhah was "Yoreh Yoreh. Yadin Yadin". ("May he decide? He may decide! May he judge? He may judge!"); and in the early days of rabbinical Judaism any ordained teacher could ordain his students. Classical semikhah was granted by a court of three judges and it later required the participation of at least one who had attained this status himself. According to Maimonides the other two need not be semukhim.

Today, semikha is generally through an institution, a yeshiva or specialized kollel, but is often granted by an individual. The testing here confirms one's ability to decide ("pasken") a question in halakha (Jewish law). The examination has a dual concern: firstly it confirms knowledge of the law as presented in Shulchan Aruch, the standard code of law (with more recent applications from relevant teshuvot, or responsa); secondly, it also confirms an understanding of the underlying principles, by testing the relevant Talmudic sugyas, together with their development by the Rishonim and Acharonim, especially the Arba'ah Turim; see Yeshiva § Jewish law.

=== Varieties of ordination ===
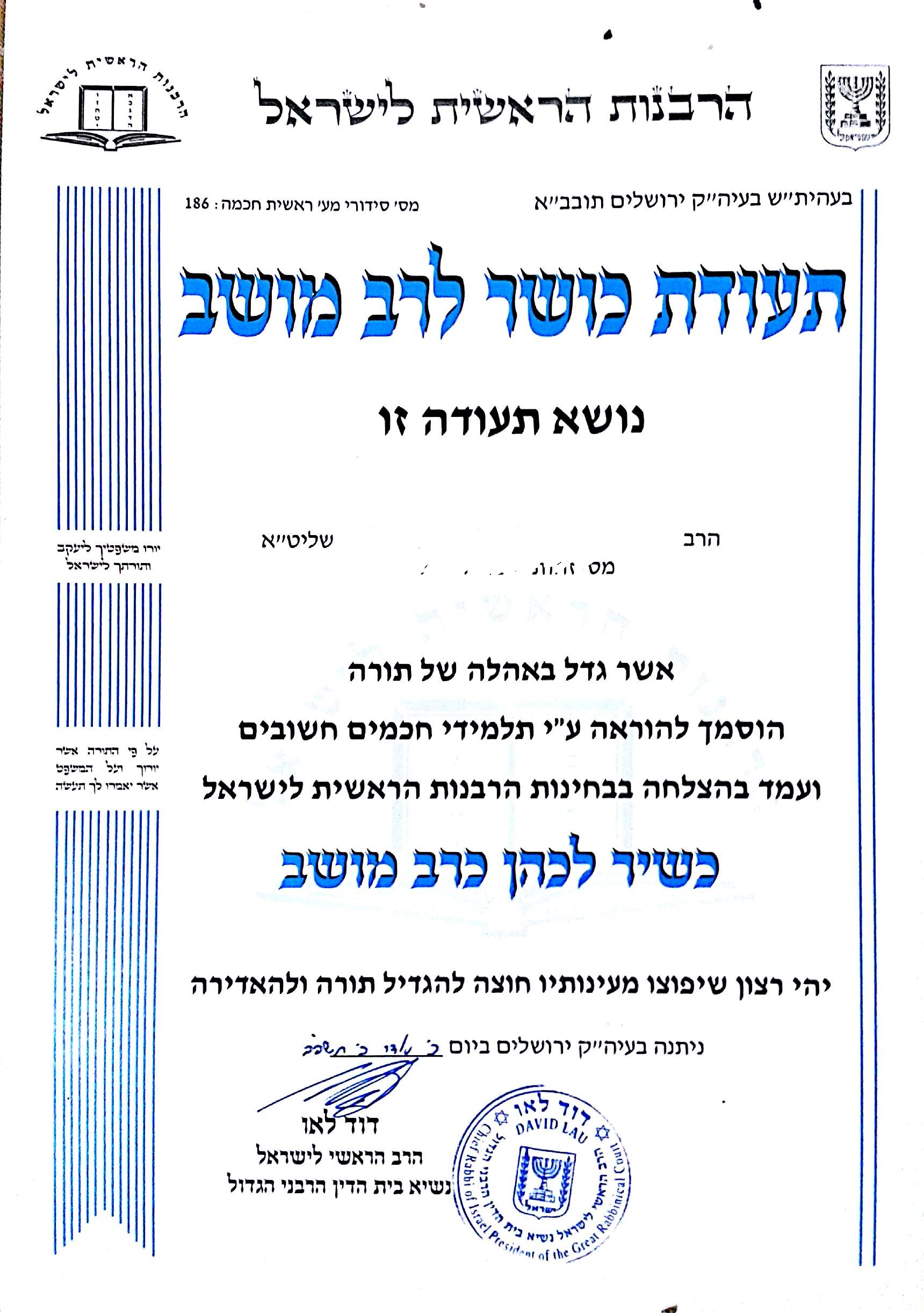
Semikhah certificate from the Chief Rabbinate of Israel. The document states that the certificant was gidal b'ohala shel Torah, "raised in the tents of Torah" - situating the candidate within the continuity of tradition - and that they have "succeeded in passing the required bechinot (tests)", and is then husmach, i.e. ordained, for Hora'ah. (The phrase "Hegia leHora'ah" "arrived at [the level of] Hora'ah" is often seen.)

The Talmud lists three classes of semikhah issued: Yoreh Yoreh, Yadin Yadin, and Yatir Bechorot Yatir; while the first two are still issued, the last is not. Additional forms of semikhah issued in modern times are discussed below.

- Yoreh Yoreh (Hebrew: יורה יורה): The recipient of this semikhah demonstrated sufficient education and proper judgment to be able to render halakhic judgments on matters of religious law as it pertains to daily life, focusing on kashrut, referred to as "Issur v'Hetter", and niddah (both from Shulchan Aruch Yoreh De'ah), and permissible or forbidden activities on Shabbat and Yom Tov (Orach Chaim). The holder of this Semikha, as above, is referred to also as a Moreh Hora'ah and the ordination itself is called Heter Hora'ah.
- Yadin Yadin (Hebrew: ידין ידין, Ashkenazi pronunciation: Yoden Yoden): The recipient of this semikhah demonstrated sufficient education and proper judgment to be able to render halakhic judgments on matters of religious law as it pertains to monetary and property disputes; the basis here is the Choshen Mishpat section, and will usually include parts of Even Haezer such as the laws of Gittin; this semikhah is usually required for a rabbi to act as a dayan (rabbinic judge), and, typically, is granted only to those already holding Yoreh Yoreh, even though the Talmud states that one can be granted Yadin Yadin without Yoreh Yoreh.
- Yatir Bechorot Yatir: The recipient of this semikhah demonstrated sufficient education and proper judgment to determine the ritual status of firstborn animals that have developed a blemish. This degree required extensive veterinary knowledge. See Burnt offering (Judaism) § Order and preparation.

Many Yoreh Yoreh programs, for example the Chief Rabbinate's and RIETS, include testing in Avelut (Laws of mourning; Yoreh Deah) and/or Jewish marital law (Even Ha'ezer section). Traditionally – and on the other hand – Yoreh Yoreh covered kashrut only, and this is still often the case. Although apparently limited, the basis here is that, as mentioned, semikha is in fact a confirmation of the ability - and right - of the holder to pasken in general, and that, as required, the rabbi can correctly apply his Talmudic and Halakhic knowledge to other areas (and where necessary refer complex cases to a posek, a more qualified authority; see Responsa § In Judaism). Similar, a semicha focusing on the laws of Shabbat is sometimes granted. Often, niddah will require a separate specialized certification, as – given their intricate and sensitive nature – an element of shimush, or "apprenticeship", pertains particularly to these halakhot. (In fact shimush more generally, is (implicitly) required before one serves as a Rabbi.) It is not uncommon for a rabbi to hold several certificates, with each semikha covering a specific area of halakha. Certification, with similar testing, is also required to qualify as a shochet, mohel, sofer, or menakker; these inhere a major practical element and thus require significant shimush.

=== Modern semakhot ===
As outlined, additional forms of semikhah are issued in modern times with their content departing from the above, to an extent reflecting the contemporary Rabbinic role. See Yeshiva § Curriculum for further outline.

An Orthodox semikha, "Rav U'Manhig", "(pulpit) Rabbi and (community) leader", essentially testifies that the recipient has sufficient Torah knowledge to serve in a position of leadership (as "rabbi" essentially means "teacher", not necessarily "halakhic authority"). The testing here covers Orach Chaim extensively, usually with limited emphasis on the underlying Talmudic sugyas. See the related discussion re "semicha-testing programs" and "online semicha" at List of rabbinical schools § Orthodox.

Pluralistic and non-denominational movements grant an ordination titled "Rav U-moreh/morah BeYisrael", "Rabbi and Teacher in Israel". The curriculum here, as above, may emphasize "the other functions of a modern rabbi such as preaching, counselling, and pastoral work", as opposed to Halakha; further, often in these institutions less emphasis is placed on Talmud and Jewish law, "but rather on sociology, cultural studies, and modern Jewish philosophy". See List of rabbinical schools § Non-denominational.

In contrast to these, the Chief Rabbinate of Israel confers the further advanced semikhah of "Rav Ir", "[Chief] Rabbi of a City". This covers additional relevant topics from all sections of Shulchan Aruch - such as gerut - and, as for Dayanut, has Yoreh Yoreh as a prerequisite; see Chief Rabbinate of Israel § Semikhah.

=== Ordination ceremony ===
The ceremony where ordination is conferred is known as Hag HaSemikha, the festival of ordination. Today, in most branches of Judaism, there is no laying on of hands; ordination is conferred as an academic degree with a diploma, signed by the officiating rabbis and often hand-written on parchment. Receiving ordination has been a festive occasion accompanied by celebration since Talmudic times. According to the Talmud, when the rabbis ordained Rabbi Zeira, they sang a bridal song in his honor: "Even though she painted not her eyes with antimony, neither darkened her cheeks with rouge, nor plaited her hair, she is still a graceful doe [of exceptional beauty]!" the analogy and implication being: just as a bride is inherently beautiful, so for ordination, one's Torah knowledge must be immediately apparent. They also sang at the ordination of Rabbi Ammi and Rabbi Assi: "Just like these, just like these, ordain for us!"; epitomizing, as they did, the ideal candidate for ordination. This wording - כל מן דין סמוכו לנא - as per the certificate displayed, is still often included on semikhah diplomas.

== Contemporary usage ==
In the prevailing sense, "smicha" generally refers to the ordination of a rabbi within all modern Jewish religious movements from Reform to Orthodox.

This "Smicha lerabbanut" signifies the transmission of rabbinic authority to give advice or judgment in Jewish law, thus overlapping to some extent with the classical usage, per #Concept above; see also Rabbi § Orthodox and Modern Orthodox Judaism. In this context, "Rav Muvhak" is sometimes used to refer to a student's primary teacher.

Smicha lehazzanut, ordination as a cantor, similarly signifies the transmission of authoritative knowledge about Jewish musical and liturgical traditions. This is granted within some denominations.

=== Status of current rabbis ===
Although presently most functioning synagogue (i.e. "pulpit") rabbis hold semikhah, this was until quite recently not always required, and in fact many Haredi rabbis may possibly not be required to hold a "formal" semikhah even though they may occupy important rabbinical and leadership positions. The reasons being that what is prized in the communities they serve and lead is most of all a supreme mastery of the Talmud with a vast knowledge of the commentaries of the Rishonim and Acharonim and Responsa, added to knowledge of the Shulchan Aruch and Halakha ("Jewish Law"). In the UK, a communal minister who does not have semikhah has the title "Reverend" rather than "rabbi".

Many Hasidic rebbes and Rosh yeshivas of major Orthodox yeshivas are not required to "prove" to their flocks that they do or do not hold formal semikhah because their reputations as Torah-scholars and sages is unquestioned and esteemed based on the recommendations of trusted sages, and the experiences and interactions that many knowledgeable Torah-observant Jews have with them, which thus gives practical testimony based on experience that these great rabbis are indeed worthy to be called as such.

For example, according to some reports Rabbi Yisrael Meir Kagan (known as the Chafetz Chayim) did not officially receive semikhah until late in life, when a formal rabbinic qualification was necessary for him to call himself "rabbi" on an immigration application. Most current poskim, however, do have semikhah.

Just as a debate exists about who is a Jew, there is little consensus as to who is a rabbi. The Reform movement in a Responsum states that for their Temples, pulpit rabbis need to attend and complete their academic program at the Reform movement's rabbinic schools. But they further state that this does not negate other sects of Judaism from accepting the time-honored semikhah of one-on-one. Nor do they deal with the issue of rabbis who are not pulpit rabbis but teach, study, and do research. They do say that the need for three rabbis is unneeded as the two additional rabbis are just witnesses and cannot attest to the new rabbi's knowledge.

=== Ordination of cantors ===
Many cantorial institutions in the United States currently grant smicha lehazzanut to their students. Some have historically used the term investiture to describe the conferral of cantorial authority onto their graduates.

The term investiture was originally intended to make a distinction between the ordination of rabbis and that of cantors. However, in response to the increased responsibility of the cantor in contemporary American synagogues, some institutions such as Hebrew Union College (Reform) have recently begun to use the term "ordination" instead of "investiture". Other institutions that ordain cantors include Hebrew College (pluralistic), the Academy for Jewish Religion (pluralistic), and Aleph (Renewal).

As of 2021, the Jewish Theological Seminary (Conservative) will begin ordaining its cantors.

=== Modern lay leader ordination ===
Beginning in the mid to late 1990s, the Reform, Renewal and Conservative Jewish movements have ordained lay leaders to positions such as spiritual director, darshan (chaplain), and pastor. Lay leaders within Judaism serve both in formal spaces like synagogues, independent minyan, in Jewish and non-Jewish organizations, hospitals and community centers.

Several yeshivas and other academies now train and certify lay leaders, such as Darshan Yeshiva, ALEPH Pastor Program, the Union for Reform Judaism, and AJRCA's chaplaincy school.

== Classical semikhah ==
Classical semikhah refers to a specific type of ordination that, according to traditional Jewish teaching, traces a line of authority back to Moses, the Great Assembly, and the Sanhedrin. The line of classical semikhah is generally believed to have died out in the 4th or 5th century CE, but it is widely held that a line of Torah conferment remains unbroken.

=== Hebrew Bible ===
According to the Hebrew Bible, Moses was the greatest prophet, and the one individual who received the Torah from God. Traditionally, Moses is also assumed to be the "first rabbi" of the Israelites. He is still known to most Jews as Moshe Rabbeinu ("Moses our rabbi").

Moses, before his death, ordained Joshua as his successor by resting his hands on Joshua:

Moses spoke to יהוה, saying, "Let יהוה, Source of the breath of all flesh, appoint someone over the community who shall go out before them and come in before them, and who shall take them out and bring them in, so that יהוה’s community may not be like sheep that have no shepherd." And יהוה answered Moses, "Single out Joshua son of Nun, an inspired man, and lay your hand upon him. Have him stand before Eleazar the priest and before the whole community, and commission him in their sight. Invest him with some of your authority, so that the whole Israelite community may obey. But he shall present himself to Eleazar the priest, who shall on his behalf seek the decision of the Urim before יהוה. By such instruction they shall go out and by such instruction they shall come in, he and all the Israelite [militia], and the whole community." Moses did as יהוה commanded him. He took Joshua and had him stand before Eleazar the priest and before the whole community. He laid his hands upon him and commissioned him—as יהוה had spoken through Moses.

This procedure caused the "spirit" in Moses to enter Joshua as well: "Now Joshua son of Nun was filled with the spirit of wisdom because Moses had laid his hands upon him; and the Israelites heeded him, doing as יהוה had commanded Moses." Similarly, when Moses found the task of leadership too difficult, God caused the "spirit" in Moses to enter seventy additional elders (though no resting of hands is mentioned here).

According to later tradition, the elders ordained their successors in the same way, and their successors ordained others. This chain of hands-on semichah continued through the time of the Second Temple to an undetermined time.

=== Mishnah and Talmud ===
Despite the name, the classical semikhah did not require a literal laying on of hands; the operative part of the ceremony consisted of a court of three, at least one of whom himself had semikhah, conferring the authority on the recipient. Both the givers and the recipient had to be in the Land of Israel, but they did not have to be in the same place. In the Mishnaic era it became the law that only someone who had semikhah could give religious and legal decisions.

The title ribbi (or "rabbi") was reserved for those with semikhah. The sages of the Babylonian Jewish community had a similar religious education, but without the semikhah ceremony they were called rav. The Talmud also relates that one can obtain the title of rabbi by those to whom he teaches or counsels.

After the failed Bar Kokhba revolt in 132–135 CE, the Romans put down the revolt, and the emperor Hadrian tried to put a permanent end to the Sanhedrin. According to the Talmud, Hadrian decreed that anyone who gave or accepted semikhah would be killed, any city in which the ceremony took place would be razed, and all crops within a mile of the ceremony's site would be destroyed. The line of succession was saved by Judah ben Bava, who took five students of the recently martyred Rabbi Akiva to a mountain pass far from any settlement or farm, and ordained all five students. When the Romans attacked them, Judah ben Bava blocked the pass with his body, allowing the others to escape, and became one of Judaism's ten Rabbinic Martyrs himself by being speared 300 times. The five new rabbis – Rabbi Meir, Shimon, Judah bar Ilai, Jose ben Halafta and Eleazar ben Shammua – escaped and became the next generation of Torah leadership.

The exact date the original semikhah succession ended is not certain. Many medieval authorities believed that this occurred during the reign of Hillel II, around the year 360 CE. However, Theodosius I forbade the Sanhedrin to assemble and declared ordination illegal. (Roman law prescribed capital punishment for any rabbi who received ordination and complete destruction of the town where the ordination occurred). It seems to have continued until at least 425, when Theodosius II executed Gamaliel VI and suppressed the Patriarchate and Sanhedrin.

=== Post-Talmudic: The decline of classical semikhah ===
The original line of succession seems to have died out in the 4th or 5th centuries. The Geonim, early medieval Jewish sages of Babylon, did not possess semikhah, and did not use the title "rabbi". They were formally known as "rav" and were entrusted with authority to make legal and religious decisions.

Some believe that classical semikhah may have even survived until the 12th century when semuchim from Lebanon and Syria were traveling to Israel in order to pass on semicha to their students. Others, such as Yisroel ben Shmuel of Shklov (1770–1839), believed semikhah may not have been broken at all but that it continued outside of the land of Israel.

Since the end of classical ordination, other forms of ordination have developed which use much of the same terminology, but have a lesser significance in Jewish law (see Rabbi#Middle Ages).

=== Attempts to revive classical semikhah ===
Maimonides ruled that "if all the sages In Israel would unanimously agree to appoint and ordain judges, then these new ordinants would possess the full authority of the original ordained judges". Based on this ruling, in 1538 Jacob Berab attempted to reestablish semikhah in Safed. This attempt attracted some prominent supporters, including Joseph Karo (author of the Shulchan Aruch), who himself received semikhah from Berab, and then gave semikhah to others. However, other rabbis ruled that Berab's semikhah was invalid. In any case, Berab's chain of semikhah died out again after several generations.

Berab's attempt was the model for several other attempts to revive semikhah and reestablish the Sanhedrin, including one attempt in Israel in 2004.

== See also ==
- Chief Rabbinate of Israel § Semikhah
- List of rabbinical schools
- Master of Rabbinic Studies
- Rabbi § Ordination
- Rabbinic Judaism
- Posek § Formulating a ruling (psak din)
- Yeshiva § Jewish law
