= Huna ben Joshua =

Babylonian rabbi (died 410)

- Born: Babylonia
- Died: 410
- Other names: Rav Huna BeReia DeRav Yehoshua
- Occupation(s): Talmudist, Scholar
- Known for: Prominent Amoraic sage, president of the general assembly in the yeshiva of Naresh

Huna ben Joshua (Hebrew: רב הונא בריה דרב יהושע Rav Huna BeReia DeRav Yehoshua; died 410) was a Babylonian rabbi of the fifth generation of Amoraim.

== Biography ==
Ben Joshua was considered one of the most prominent Amoraic sages of his generation. He was a student of Rava, who seems to have been his principal teacher and sometimes praise and blame him Ben Joshua appears to have been the pupil of Abaye, as well. He was a colleague and a scholarly opponent (bar plugata) of Rav Papa, from whom he was inseparable both in and out of the academy.

When Rav Papa became head of the yeshiva of Naresh (an academy that later was relocated to Mata Mehasia, a suburb of Sura, Huna was appointed president of the general assembly (resh kallah) of the academy.

During his studies under Rava, ben Joshua earned his livelihood from a small landed property, enabling him to make the time needed for his studies. Later, he became a business partner of his colleague Rav Papa and earned his living from selling sesame.

Ben Joshua was wealthy. He never walked more than four cubits bareheaded. He ate very slowly so that Rav Papa consumed in the same time four times as much and Rabina eight times as much.

He lived to a great age, outliving Rava by 57 years. Once, in the lifetime of Rav Papa, ben Joshua fell desperately ill, but his life was spared because he was forbearing.
