= Qere and Ketiv =

Differences between how the Hebrew Bible is spoken versus read

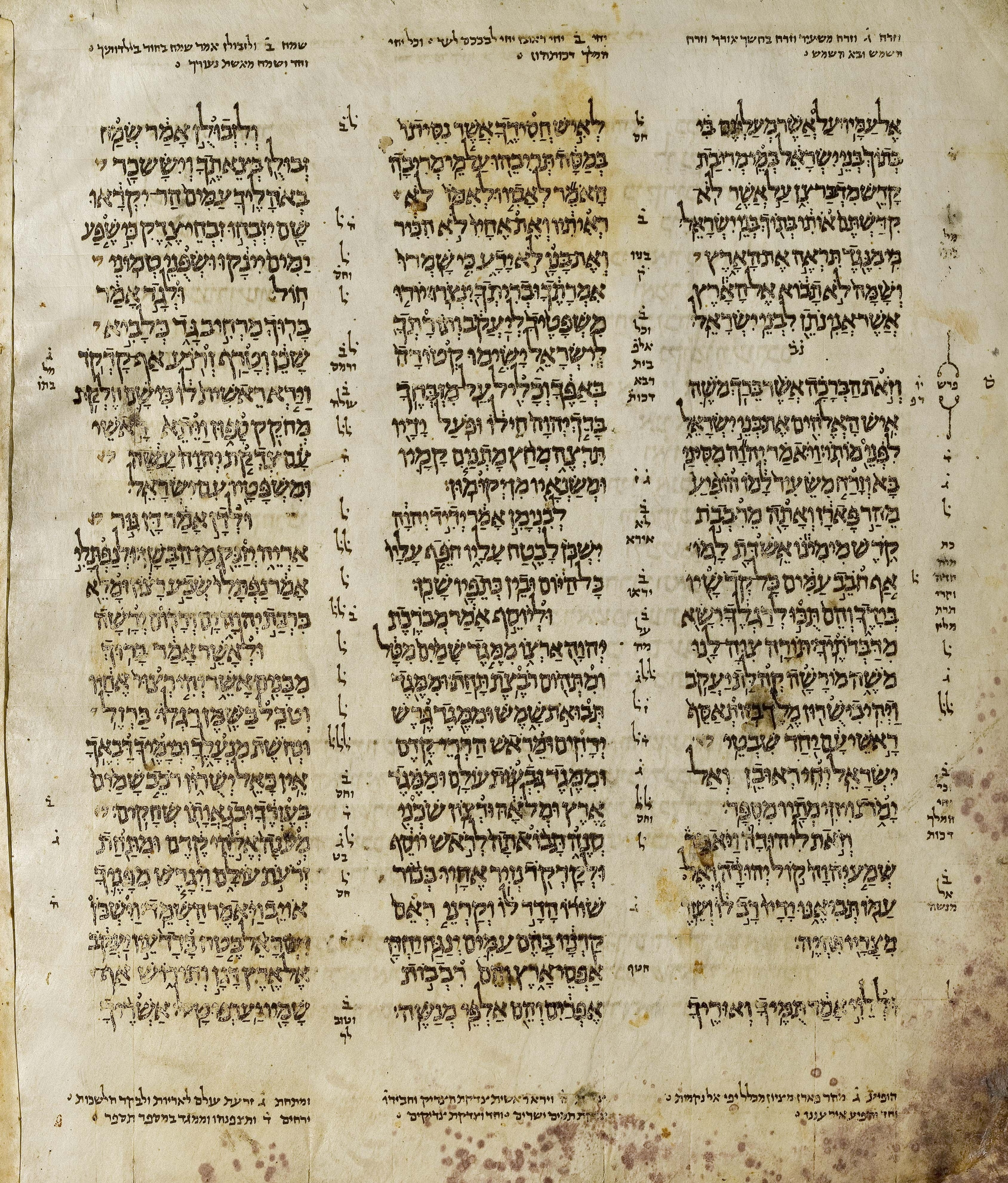
An image from the Masoretic Aleppo Codex of Deuteronomy 33, containing a qere and ketiv in the second column, the fifth line, the second word (33:9). The ketiv is "Beno" - "his son" בְּנוֹ, while the qere is "banaw" - "his sons" בָּנָיו.

Qere and Ketiv (from the Aramaic qere or q're, קְרֵי, "[what is] read"; ketiv, or ketib, kethib, kethibh, kethiv, כְּתִיב, "[what is] written") refers to a system for marking differences between what is written in the consonantal text of the Hebrew Bible, as preserved by scribal tradition, and what is read. In such situations, the qere is the technical orthographic device used to indicate the pronunciation of the words in the Masoretic Text of the Hebrew language scriptures (Tanakh), while the ketiv indicates their written form, as inherited from tradition.

The word קרי is often pointed קְרִי and pronounced "kri" or "keri", reflecting the opinion that it is a passive participle rather than an imperative. This is reflected in the Ashkenazi pronunciation "keri uchsiv".

== The Masoretic tradition ==
Torah scrolls for use in public reading in synagogues contain only the Hebrew language consonantal text, handed down by tradition (with only a very limited and ambiguous indication of vowels by means of matres lectionis). However, in the Masoretic codices of the 9th–10th centuries, and most subsequent manuscripts and published editions of the Tanakh intended for personal study, the pure consonantal text is annotated with vowel points, cantillation marks and other diacritic symbols used by the Masoretes to indicate how it should be read and chanted, besides marginal notes serving various functions. That Masoretic reading or pronunciation is known as the qere (Aramaic קרי "to be read"), while the pre-Masoretic consonantal spelling is known as the ketiv (Aramaic כתיב "(what is) written").

The basic consonantal text written in the Hebrew alphabet was rarely altered; but sometimes the Masoretes noted a different reading of a word than that found in the pre-Masoretic consonantal text. The scribes used qere/ketiv to show, without changing the received consonantal text, that in their tradition a different reading of the text was to be used. Qere were also used to correct obvious errors in the consonantal text without changing it.

However, not all qere/ketiv represented cases of textual doubt; sometimes the change is deliberate. For example, in Deut. 28:27, the ketiv word ובעפלים ophalim, "hemorrhoids," was replaced with the qere וּבַטְּחֹרִים techorim, "abscesses," because the ketiv was (after the return from Exile) considered too obscene to read in public. A very high percentage of qere/ketiv is accounted for by change of dialect from old archaic Hebrew to later Hebrew. When the old Hebrew dialect fell into disuse and certain words became unfamiliar to the masses, the scribes amended the original dialect to the later familiar dialect. A good example is the word "Jerusalem," which in old Hebrew was always written ירושלם yrwšlm, but in a later period was written ירושלים yrwšlym. The qere provides the more familiar reading without altering the text. This is also evident throughout 2 Kings 4, where the archaic Hebrew 2p feminine form of -ti is consistently eliminated by the qere, which replaces it with the familiar standard form of -t.

In such Masoretic texts, the vowel diacritics of the qere (the Masoretic reading) would be placed in the main text, added around the consonantal letters of the ketiv (the written variant to be substituted – even if it contains a completely different number of letters), with a special sign indicating that there was a marginal note for this word. In the margins there would be a ק sign (for qere), followed by the consonants of the qere reading. In this way, the vowel points were removed from the qere and written instead on the ketiv. Despite this, the vowels and consonantal letters of the qere were still meant to be read together.

=== "Ordinary" qere ===
In an "ordinary" qere, there is only a difference in certain closely related letters, or letters that can be silent (as in Genesis 8:17). For example, the similarly shaped letters י ו ן are often exchanged (Deuteronomy 34:7), as are כ ב (Esther 3:4) and the similar-sounding ד ת (Song of Songs 4:9). Very often, one of the letters א ה ו י are inserted (Ecclesiastes 10:3) or removed from a word (Deuteronomy 2:33). Many other similar cases exist. Other times, letters are reordered within the word (Ecclesiastes 9:4).

Because the difference between the qere and ketiv is relatively large, a note is made in footnotes, sidenotes or brackets to indicate it (see "Typography" below).

=== "Vowel" qere ===
Sometimes, although the letters are unchanged, the vowel points differ between the qere and ketiv of the word (Genesis 12:8). The ketiv is typically omitted with no indication, leaving only the vowelization for the qere. Often the ketiv is left in an unusual spelling, but other times, both qere and ketiv remain in standard spelling.

This type of qere is different from qere perpetuum, because here, the consonants do not change. In a qere perpetuum, the consonants actually do change.

=== "Omitted" qere ===
Occasionally, a word is not read at all (Ruth 3:12), in which case the word is marked ketiv velo qere, meaning "written and not read."

=== "Added" qere ===
Occasionally, a word is read but not written at all (Judges 20:14; Ruth 3:5), in which case the word is marked qere velo ketiv, meaning "read and not written."

=== "Euphemistic" qere ===
In rarer cases, the word is replaced entirely (Deuteronomy 28:27, 30; Samuel I 5:6) for reasons of tohorat halashon, "purity of language." This type of qere is noted in a printed Hebrew Bible.

=== "Split/Joined" qere ===
In such a case, a ketiv is one word while the qere is multiple words (Deuteronomy 33:2) or vice versa (Lamentations 4:3).

=== Qere perpetuum ===
In a few cases a change may be marked solely by the adjustment of the vowels written on the consonants, without any notes in the margin, if it is common enough that this will suffice for the reader to recognize it. This is known as a qere perpetuum ("perpetual" qere). It differs from an "ordinary qere" in that there is no note marker and no accompanying marginal note — these are certain commonly occurring cases of qere/ketiv in which the reader is expected to understand that a qere exists merely from seeing the vowel points of the qere in the consonantal letters of the ketiv.

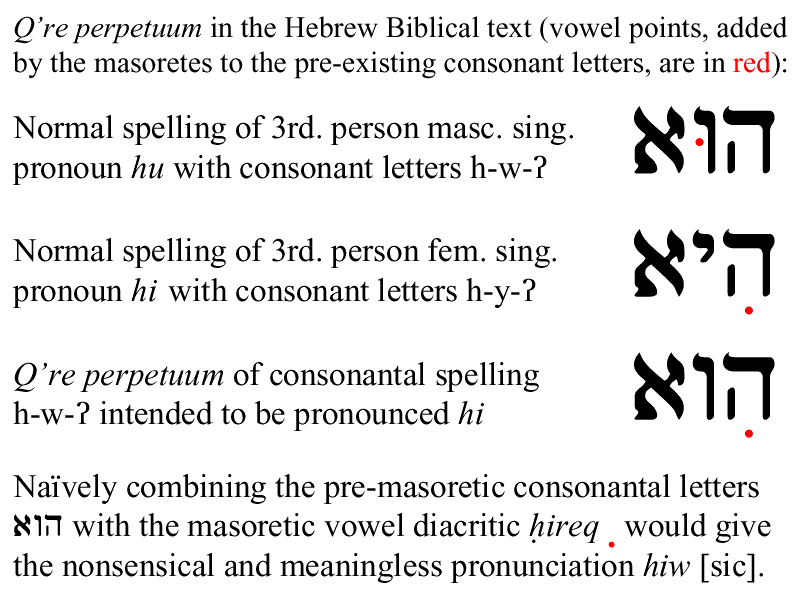
Qere perpetuum of the 3rd. fem. singular pronoun

For example, in the Pentateuch, the third-person singular feminine pronoun היא hī is usually spelled the same as the third-person singular masculine pronoun הוא hū. The Masoretes indicated this situation by adding a written diacritic symbol for the vowel [i] to the pre-Masoretic consonantal spelling hwʔ הוא (see diagram). The resulting orthography would seem to indicate a pronunciation hiw, but this is meaningless in Biblical Hebrew, and a knowledgeable reader of the biblical text would know to read the feminine pronoun hī here.

Another example of an important qere perpetuum in the text of the Bible is the name of the God of Israel – יהוה (cf. Tetragrammaton). Often it is marked with the vowels יְהֹוָה, indicating that it is to be pronounced as אֲדֹנָי Adonai (meaning "my Lord") rather than with its own vowels. The consensus of mainstream scholarship is that "Yehowah" (or in Latin transcription "Jehovah") is a pseudo-Hebrew form which was mistakenly created when Medieval and/or Renaissance Christian scholars misunderstood this common qere perpetuum, so that "the bastard word 'Jehovah' [was] obtained by fusing the vowels of the one word with the consonants of the other" (similar to reading hiw for the qere perpetuum of the third-person singular feminine pronoun). The usual Jewish practice at the time of the Masoretes was to pronounce it as "Adonai", as is still the Jewish custom today.

Occasionally, the Tetragrammaton is marked יֱהֹוִה (Deuteronomy 3:24, Psalms 73:28) to indicate a qere of אֱלֹהִים Elohim, another Divine Name.

== Interpretation and significance ==
=== Jewish tradition ===
In Jewish tradition, both the qere and the ketiv are considered highly significant. When reading the Torah scroll in the synagogue, Jewish law stipulates that the qere is to be read and not the ketiv, to the extent that if the ketiv was read, it must be corrected and read according to the qere. In addition however, Jewish law requires the scroll to be written according to the ketiv, and this is so critical that substituting the qere for the ketiv invalidates the entire Torah scroll.

Various traditional commentaries on the Torah illustrate the interplay of meaning between the qere and the ketiv, showing how each enhances the meaning of the other. Some examples of this include:

- Genesis 8:17: "Take out (ketiv/written: Send out) all the living things that are with you, from all the flesh: the birds, the animals, all the creeping things that creep over the earth; they shall swarm in the earth and be fruitful and multiply on the earth."
  - Rashi, ibid.: It is written as "send out" and read as "take out." [Noah] is to say to them, "Go out!" Thus, [the written form] "send out." If they do not want to go out, you should take them out.
- Genesis 12:8: "And he [Abram] moved from there to the mountain east of Beit-Eil and set up his tent (ketiv/written: her tent); Beit-Eil was in the west and Ai in the east. He built an altar there to the Lord and called in the name of the Lord."
  - Rashi, ibid.: It is written as "her tent." First, he set up his wife's tent, and afterwards his own. Bereishit Rabbah[, 39:15].
  - Siftei Chachamim, ibid.: How does Rashi know that Abraham erected his wife's tent before his own; maybe he put up his own tent first? His words were based on the words of the Talmud that "one should honor his wife more than himself" (Yevamot 62b).
- Exodus 39:33: "And they brought the Mishkan to Moses: the tent and all its vessels; its hooks, its beams, its bars (ketiv/written: its bar), its pillars, and its sockets."
  - Rashi, Exodus 26:26: The five [bars which supported the wall-planks and kept them straight] were [in] three [lines going horizontally through each plank of the three walls], but the top and bottom [bars in the three walls] were made of two parts, each extending through half of the wall. Each [bar] would enter a hole [in the wall] on opposite sides until they met each other. Thus we find that the top and bottom [bars] were [really] two [bars each], which were four [half-bars]. The middle bar, however, extended the entire length of the wall, going from end to end of the wall.
  - Mefane'ach Nelamim, cited in Eim LaMikra VeLaMasoret, Exodus 39:33: The Talmud (Shabbat 98b with Rashi) understands "from end to end" as a miracle: after the planks were in place on the three sides of the Mishkan, a seventy-cubit-long bar would be inserted into the center of the first plank at the eastern end of either the northern or southern wall. When that bar reached the end of that wall, it would miraculously curve itself so that it continued within the western wall. At the end of that wall, it again turned to fill the space drilled through the planks of the third wall.... Thus the middle bar, which seemed to be three separate bars for the three walls, was really one long bar. The qere, "its bars" refers to the simple interpretation that there were three distinct middle-bars, one for each wall. But the ketiv, "its bar," refers to the second interpretation, that the three middle bars were really only one bar that miraculously spanned all three walls.

=== In translations ===
Modern translators nevertheless tend to follow the qere rather than the ketiv.

Frederick Henry Ambrose Scrivener in his 1884 commentary on the 1611 Authorized Version of the Bible (a.k.a. the King James Bible) reports 6637 marginal notes in the KJV Old Testament, of which 31 are instances of the KJV translators drawing attention to qere and ketiv, most being like Psalm 100 verse 3 with ketiv being in the main KJV text and the qere in the KJV marginalia (albeit that the Revised Version placed this qere in the main text), but a handful (such as 1 Samuel 27:8 for example) being the other way around.

== Typography ==
Modern editions of the Chumash and Tanakh include information about the qere and ketiv, but with varying formatting, even among books from the same publisher. Usually, the qere is written in the main text with its vowels, and the ketiv is in a side- or footnote (as in the Gutnick and Stone editions of the Chumash, from Kol Menachem and Artscroll, respectively). Other times, the ketiv is indicated in brackets, in-line with the main text (as in the Rubin edition of the Prophets, also from Artscroll).

In a Tikkun, which is used to train the synagogue Torah reader, both the full text using the ketiv and the full text using the qere are printed, side-by-side. However, an additional note is still made in brackets (as in the Kestenbaum edition from Artscroll) or in a footnote (as in the Tikkun LaKorim from Ktav.)

In older prayerbooks (such as the older, all-Hebrew edition of Siddur Tehillat Hashem al pi Nusach HaArizal, in the prayer Tikkun Chatzot), the ketiv was vowelized according to the qere and printed in the main text. The unvowelized qere was printed in a footnote.

== See also ==
- Gikun
