= Hoshaiah Rabbah =

Early 3rd-century Judean Jewish amora

Personal life
- Born: Hoshaiah Rabbah
- Parent: Hama (father)
- Notable work: Compilation of Baraitot

Religious life
- Religion: Judaism
- Sect: Rabbinic Judaism

Jewish leader
- Teacher: Judah ha-Nasi
- Disciples: Johanan bar Nappaha

Hoshaiah Rabbah or Hoshaʻyā Rabbā (Hebrew: הושעיה רבה) was an amora of the first generation in Rabbinic Judaism and a compiler of baraitot explaining the Mishnah and the Tosefta. He is known from tractates of the Jerusalem Talmud.

== Biography ==
He was closely associated with the successors of Judah ha-Nasi, as was his father, Hama, with Judah ha-Nasi himself. Hama lived in Sepphoris, the residence of Judah ha-Nasi and the seat of the patriarchs.

Hoshaiah's yeshiva was located at Sepphoris for many years, where pupils crowded to hear his lectures. Johanan bar Nappaha, one of his greatest disciples, declared that Hoshaiah in his generation was like Rabbi Meir in his: even his colleagues could not always grasp the profundity of his arguments according to Eruvin 53a. And The esteem in which Hoshaiah was held by his pupils may be gauged by the statement that, even after Johanan had himself become a great scholar and a famous teacher and no longer needed Hoshaiah's instruction, he continued visiting the master, who in the meantime had grown old and moved his school to Caesarea in the Jerusalem Talmud, Sanhedrin, Chapter 11, page 30b.

According to the Jerusalem Talmud, Peah, Chapter 8, page 21b, Hoshaiah's consideration for others is exemplified in his gracious apology to the blind teacher whom he had engaged for his son and whom he did not suffer to meet visitors at dinner for fear that he might be embarrassed.

Hoshaiah's authority must have been very powerful in his later years, when he successfully resisted the efforts of Gamaliel III, the son of Judah ha-Nasi, to introduce demai into Syria according to the Jerusalem Talmud, Ḥallah, Chapter 4, page 60a. It is also indicated by his remarkable interposition regarding the Mishnah, which declares that "a Gentile's testimony in the case of an agunah is allowed only if stated as a matter of fact and without any intention to testify" in the Jerusalem Talmud, Yebamot 16:5; and the Babylonian Talmud, Yebamot 121b.

== Teachings ==
=== Halacha ===
According to the Jerusalem Talmud, Kiddushin, Chapter 1, page 60a and Bava Kamma, Chapter 4, page 4c, Hoshaiah was called the "father of the Mishnah"; not so much because of his collection and edition of the mishnayot as because of his ability to explain and interpret them. His most important halakhic decision is directed against the standard weights and measures, held by Johanan bar Nappaha to be traditional from the Sinaitic period. Hoshaiah's radical point of view can be traced to his theory of the development of the Mishnah. He even goes so far as to overrule both the Houses of Hillel and Shammai concerning offerings brought during the Three Pilgrimage Festivals in Hagigah 1:2. The custom of greeting mourners on Shabbat was permitted in southern Galilee, including Caesarea Maritima, and prohibited in other places. According to the Jerusalem Talmud, Mo'ed Katan, Chapter 3, page 82d, Hoshaiah happened to be in a specific town on the Shabbat, and, meeting mourners, greeted them, saying, "I do not know your custom, but I greet you according to our custom".

=== Aggadah ===
Hoshaiah's aggadic teachings are numerous, scattered principally in Midrash Rabbah, which some have erroneously attributed to him because of the opening words "R. Hoshaiah Rabbah." In Genesis Rabbah, Hoshaiah's text concerning the Genesis creation narrative is the verse "Then I was by him, as one brought up [= אמון] with him", in Proverbs 8:30. He transposes the letters to read אומן "an architect". He explains that "wisdom" (the Torah) was used as an instrument by God to create the universe. He illustrates this by the example of an earthly king who, in building a palace, needs an architect with plans and specifications.

=== Relations with Origen and Christianity ===
Freudenthal points out the analogy between Philo's ideas and those of Hoshaiah and Wilhelm Bacher expresses his opinion that if Hoshaiah had not himself read the philosopher's works, he at least had heard of them from Origen, the most important champion of Philo. In a dialogue with Hoshaiah regarding circumcision, a "philosopher" (identified as Origen by Bacher) asked: "'If circumcision is so dear to Him [God], why was it not given to Adam the first man?'" Hoshaiah replied that man, with all things created on the first six days, needs improving and perfecting and that circumcision conduces to perfection. Bacher quotes a passage in which Hoshaiah refuted the incarnation dogma:

So, when the Holy One blessed be He created Adam the first man, the ministering angels erred concerning him and sought to proclaim 'holy' before him. What did the Holy One blessed be He do? He cast a deep slumber upon him, and everyone then knew that he was [merely] a man. That is what is written: "Desist from man, who has breath in his nostrils, for in what way is he worthy?" (Isaiah 2:22).

There are more examples in the Talmud to justify the assertion that Hoshaiah, as the representative of Rabbinic Judaism, was in constant touch with early Christians at Caesarea Maritima, particularly with Origen, who was ordained presbyter (bishop) at Caesarea in 228 and who in 231 opened a philosophical and theological school attended by persons from all parts, anxious to hear his interpretation of the Christian Scriptures. Origen died in 254 at Tyre, so his last twenty-five years were spent in the region where most of the Amoraim lived. The "philosopher" whom the latter mention as controverting Hoshaiah's exegesis was doubtless Origen himself or one of his students. The influence brought to bear by Hoshaiah and others probably induced Origen to formulate the doctrine of the different degrees of dignity in the Trinity, for which Origen was accused as a heretic.

Hoshaiah was very strict in requiring from a proselyte both circumcision and mikveh immersion in the presence of three rabbis according to Yevamot 46b; this was very likely directed against the free conversion of gentiles by Judaizing Christians. In a case of partition by heirs or partners, the Jerusalem Talmud, Bava Batra 1:5:6, records, "'But Holy Scripture they should not divide even if both of them want it.' Rebbi Hoshaia said, for example, Psalms and the Books of Chronicles. But Psalms and Psalms one may divide." It is explained that such an exchange would be considered as unequal and as giving the impression that one book is holier than another. This is more easily understood because Judaizing Christians exalted Psalms over the other books of the Hebrew Bible, especially the Books of Chronicles, in contrast with the Jewish view, which recognizes no preference between the various books.
