= Shimon ben Pazi =

Shimon ben Pazi, also known as Rabbi Simon, was an amora of the third generation. He was a student of Johanan bar Nappaha and Joshua ben Levi. He is commonly called "Rabbi Shimon ben Pazi" in the Babylonian Talmud and "Rabbi Shimon" in the Jerusalem Talmud and midrashim. He lived in the south of the Land of Israel but also visited Tiberias, where he studied with Johanan bar Nappaha. He was the first to enumerate God's Thirteen Attributes of Mercy and the first to use the technical theological phrase tiqqun soferim "scribal correction".
