= Naresh (city) =

Ancient Babylonian city

Naresh or Nareš was a city from the area called by ancient Jewish sources Babylonia, situated near Sura on a canal. It may be identical with the city of Nahras or Nahar Sar on the Tigris, and is mentioned together with Maḥuza, Safonia, and Pumbedita, although it must not be inferred that these cities were near one another. It was probably located about 20km southeast of Sura, at the modern village of Narsa in the Hilla region.

== See also ==
- Rav Papa
