= Mar bar Rav Ashi =

Babylonian rabbi (died 468)

Mar bar Rav Ashi (Hebrew: מר בר רב אשי) (d. 468) was a Babylonian rabbi who lived in the 5th century (seventh generation of amoraim). He would sign his name as Tavyomi (or Tabyomi, Hebrew: טביומי), which was either his first name or his nickname.

== Biography ==
According to Abraham ibn Daud, he received his personal name (Tavyomi) due to the "good days" (Aramaic: tav=good, yomei=days) which prevailed during his lifetime. However, this tradition is difficult to understand, since the beginning of his official activity was marked by the bitter religious persecution by Yazdegerd II. That king died in 457; and his death was ascribed in part to Tavyomi's prayer. The name he is usually known by, Mar bar Rav Ashi, translates to "Master, son of Rav Ashi", as he was the son of Rav Ashi.

He achieved a reputation for scholarship even during Rav Ashi's lifetime. There is an allusion to his marriage, which took place in his father's house.

He was not elected director of the Sura Academy until 455 (ד'רט"ו, Hebrew calendar), 28 years after his father's death, when he was chosen under the extraordinary circumstances as described in the Talmud. He held this position until his death, on the 11th of Tishrei, Motzei (the day after) Yom Kippur, 468.

He continued his father's work in revising the Babylonian Talmud; according to Abraham ibn Daud, he and Maremar were its final redactors.

Few details are known of his official activity. He once issued a ruling about the kashrut practices of the exilarchs. He recused himself from judging Torah scholars, saying: "I love every scholar as myself; and no one can pronounce impartial judgment on himself". The anecdote which relates how he forced a demon into submission is typical of the views both of him and of his time.

His authority in halakhah is shown by a rule (probably of saboraic origin) appearing in Seder Tanna'im veAmora'im, that with two exceptions, decisions are always rendered according to his views. No aggadic sayings of his have been preserved.
