= Rav Pappa =

Babylonian rabbi (c. 300 – 375)

Rav Pappa (Hebrew: רַב פַּפָּא) (c. 300 – 375) was a Babylonian rabbi, of the fifth generation of amoraim.

== Biography ==
He was a student of Rava and Abaye. After the death of his teachers he founded a school at Naresh, a city near Sura, in which he officiated as "resh metivta," his friend and associate, Rav Huna ben Joshua, acting as "resh kallah" (356-375).

Rav Papa's father seems to have been wealthy and to have enabled his son to devote himself to study. Rav Papa inherited some property from his father; and he also amassed great wealth by brewing beer, an occupation in which he was an expert. He likewise engaged in extensive and successful business undertakings, and his teacher Rava once said of him: "Happy is the righteous man who is as prosperous on earth as only the wicked usually are!". However, Rava also accused Rav Papa and his contemporary Huna of being exploitative in business: "You would take the coats from people's backs". Rav Papa was known for his honesty in business: he once returned a field he had purchased upon learning that the seller regretted the sale.

He is known to have married two wives. One was the daughter of a kohen, and he attributed his wealth to this marriage. The second was the daughter of Abba Sura'ah (=of Sura). They do not seem to have lived happily together, for she prided herself on the nobility of her ancestry as contrasted with his own. He therefore said, referring to his own experience: "Be circumspect and not hasty in marrying, and take a wife from a class of society lower than your own". Several of his children married prominent figures in Jewish Babylonian society.

He was obese, and once noted that he could break a bench simply by sitting on it.

It is reported that once a non-Jew owed him money, and tried to avoid payment by inventing a blood libel that Rav Papa had killed the non-Jew's son, placing a dead baby under a blanket and encouraging Rav Papa to sit on the blanket. According to one version of the story, Rav Papa figured out the plot and refused to sit on the blanket; according to other versions he did sit on the blanket, and then was either forced to flee the country, or to pay a steep fine. However, it is almost certain that the story of Rav Papa and the baby was not originally part of the Talmud, but rather was inserted centuries later in the time of the rishonim.

== Teachings ==
Rav Papa did not have reputation for scholarship among his peers. He lacked independence of judgment; in the case of two conflicting opinions he tried to accept both. He was, consequently, not greatly respected as a scholar; and R. Idi b. Abin Naggara termed him and Huna ben Joshua "dardeki" (children). R. Huna b. Manoah, Samuel b. Judah, and R. Ḥiyya of Vestania, pupils of Rava, came, after their teacher's death, to attend Rav Papa's lectures, which they found obscure and vague. They communicated their opinions to one another by signs, to the great chagrin of Rav Papa, who noticed them, and said: "Let the scholars ["rabbanan"] go in peace". R. Simai b. Ashi (father of Rav Ashi), who also attended Rav Papa's lectures, often embarrassed him by questions; so that Rav Papa once fell on his knees and prayed that God might protect him from being humiliated by Simai. Simai, who witnessed this scene in silence, thereupon resolved to desist; and he asked no further questions at any time. Rav Papa was extremely anxious to obtain a reputation as scholar, but he also endeavored to do honor to all other scholars. He never excommunicated one, and whenever, during his business journeys, he came to a place in which a scholar lived he visited him. Once when an unseemly reference to scholars escaped him, he fasted in atonement, although he disliked fasting and it did not agree with him.

Rav Papa made journeys in connection with his business, and thus gained much knowledge of the world. He was especially interested in the collection of popular proverbs which he considered as authoritative, using them even to refute the words of a sage. The sayings quoted by him include the following:

- If no grain is in the house, quarrels knock at the door and enter.
- Sow corn for thy use that thou mayest not be obliged to purchase it; and strive to acquire a piece of property".
- The weasel and the cat made a marriage of convenience on the occasion of the fat of misfortune!
- Judgment delayed is judgment lost.

== Rav Papa's sons and the siyum ==
At many modern siyums, a short prayer is said which mentions ten sons of Rav Papa. According to one explanation, whenever he completed a tractate in the Talmud he held a large party at which he invited his ten sons and many other people. Other homiletic understandings exist, connecting the ten names to the Ten Commandments. His ten sons: Hanina b. Pappa, Rami b. Pappa, Nachman b. Pappa, Ahai b. Pappa, Abba Mari b. Pappa, Rafram b. Pappa, Rakhish b. Pappa, Surhav b. Pappa, Adda b. Pappa, Daru b. Pappa.

This passage is first mentioned by Hai Gaon, who however said that not all the names were sons of the well-known Rav Papa, but that tradition held reciting the names was a segulah against forgetting. Some of the names refer to people who lived in earlier generations; for example, Rafram bar Papa was a contemporary of Rav Chisda, Rachish bar Papa was apparently a student of Rav, Aha, Aba, and Ada or Hiyya bar Papa are mentioned in the Talmud with the title "Rabbi" which was applied to scholars from the Land of Israel but not from Babylonia, and Surhav bar Papa was apparently a student of Ze'iri.
