= Amoraim =

Jewish scholars of the period from about 200 to 500 CE

Amoraim (Jewish Babylonian Aramaic: אמוראים [ʔamoraˈʔim], singular Amora אמורא [ʔamoˈra]; "those who say" or "those who speak over the people", or "spokesmen") refers to Jewish scholars of the period from about 200 to 500 CE, who "said" or "told over" the teachings of the Oral Torah. They were primarily located in Babylonia and the Land of Israel. Their legal discussions and debates were eventually codified in the Gemara. The Amoraim followed the Tannaim in the sequence of ancient Jewish scholars. The Tannaim were direct transmitters of uncodified oral tradition; the Amoraim expounded upon and clarified the oral law after its initial codification.

== The Amoraic era ==
The first Babylonian Amoraim were Abba Arikha, respectfully referred to as Rav, and his contemporary and frequent debate partner, Shmuel. Among the earliest Amoraim in Israel were Johanan bar Nappaha and Shimon ben Lakish. Traditionally, the Amoraic period is reckoned as seven or eight generations (depending on where one begins and ends). The last Amoraim are generally considered to be Ravina I and Rav Ashi, and Ravina II, nephew of Ravina I, who codified the Babylonian Talmud around 500 CE. In total, 761 amoraim are mentioned by name in the Jerusalem and Babylonian Talmuds. 367 of them were active in the land of Israel from around 200–350 CE, while the other 394 lived in Babylonia during 200–500 CE.

In the Talmud itself, the singular amora generally refers to a lecturer's assistant; the lecturer would state his thoughts briefly, and the amora would then repeat them aloud for the public's benefit, adding translation and clarification where needed.

== Prominent Amoraim ==
The following is an abbreviated listing of the most prominent of the (hundreds of) Amoraim mentioned in the Talmud. More complete listings may be provided by some of the external links below. See also List of rabbis.

=== First generation (approx. 230–250 CE) ===
- Abba Arikha (d. 247), known as Rav, last Tanna, first Amora. Disciple of Judah haNasi. Moved from Eretz Yisrael to Babylonia (219). Founder and Dean of the Yeshiva at Sura.
- Samuel of Nehardea (d. 254), a disciple of Judah haNasi's students and others, and Dean of the Yeshiva at Nehardea.
- Joshua ben Levi (early 3rd century), headed the school of Lod.
- Bar Kappara (active about 180 to 220)
- Rav Karna, a colleague of Samuel of Nehardea, serving as a rabbinic judge.

The term "judges of the Exile" in the Babylonian Talmud is associated with Karna and Samuel of Nehardea.

=== Second generation (approx. 250–290 CE) ===
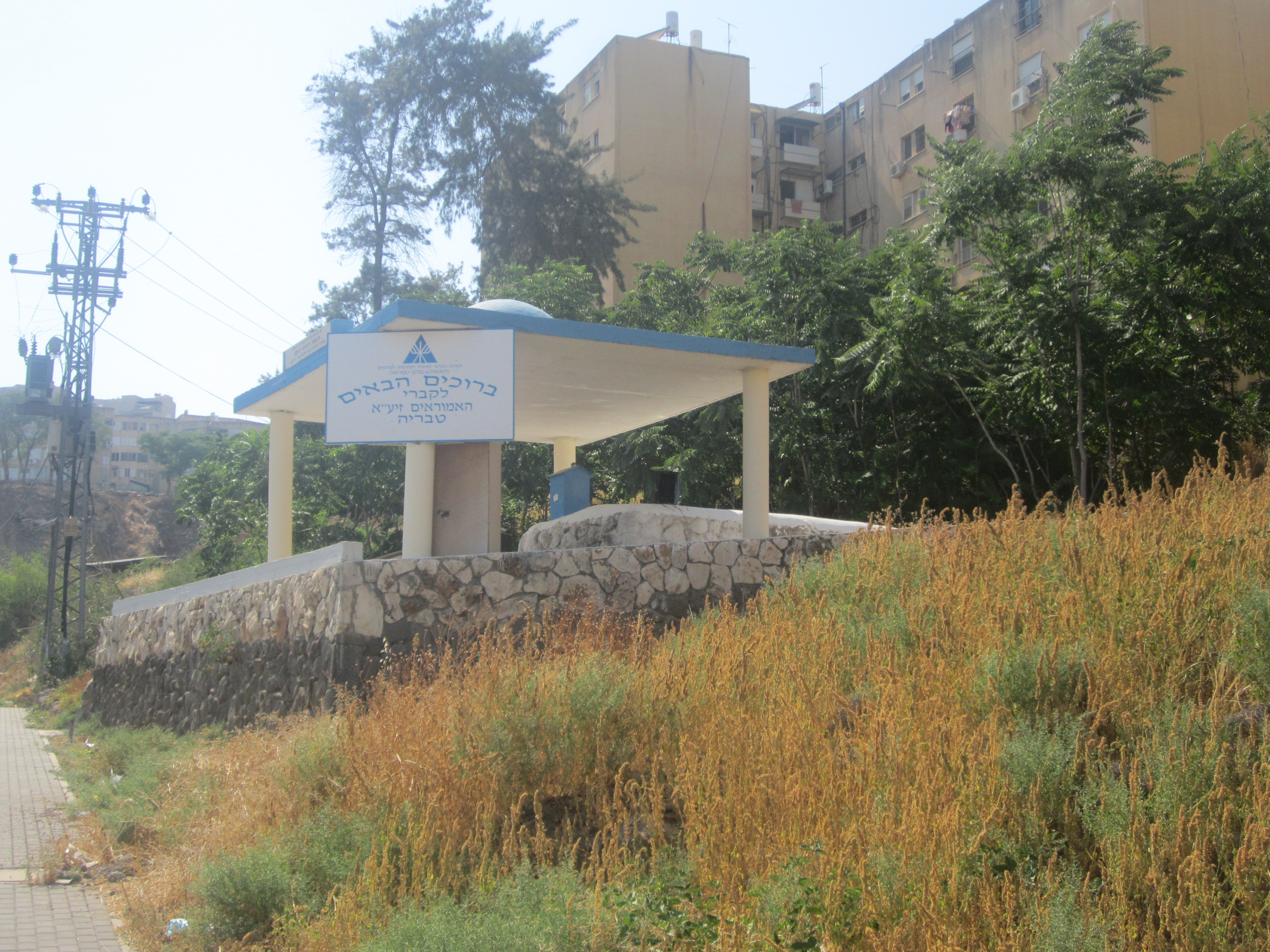
Tomb of the Amoraim in Tiberias

- Rav Huna (d. 297), disciple of Abba Arikha and Samuel of Nehardea. Dean of the Yeshiva at Sura.
- Judah ben Ezekiel (d. 299), disciple of Abba Arikha and Samuel of Nehardea. Dean of the Pumbedita Academy.
- Adda bar Ahavah, (3rd and 4th centuries), disciple of Abba Arikha.
- Hanan bar Rava, disciple of Abba Arikha.
- Hillel, son of Gamaliel III (fl. early 3rd century), disciple and grandson of Judah haNasi, and younger brother of Judah II.
- Judah II (fl. early 3rd century), disciple and grandson of Judah haNasi, and son and successor of Gamaliel III as Nasi. Sometimes called Rabbi Judah Nesi'ah, and occasionally Rebbi like his grandfather.
- Shimon ben Lakish (d. late 3rd century), student of Yohanan ben Zakkai, Rabbi Yannai and others, and colleague of Johanan bar Nappaha.
- Johanan bar Nappaha (d. 279 or 289), disciple of Judah haNasi and Rabbi Yannai. Dean of the Tiberian Academy. Primary author of the Jerusalem Talmud.
- Samuel ben Nahman
- Shila of Kefar Tamarta
- Rabbi Isaac Nappaha
- Anani ben Sason

=== Third generation (approx. 290–320 CE) ===
- Rabbah (d. 320), disciple of Rav Huna and Rav Yehudah. Dean of the Yeshiva at Pumbedita.
- Rav Yosef (d. 323), disciple of Rav Huna and Rav Yehudah. Dean of the Yeshiva at Pumbedita.
- Rav Zeira (Israel)
- Rav Chisda (d. 309), disciple of Rav, Shmuel, and Rav Huna. Dean of the Yeshiva at Sura.
- Shimon ben Pazi
- Rav Sheshet
- Rav Nachman (d. 320), disciple of Rav, Shmuel, and Rabbah bar Avuha. Did not head his own yeshiva, but was a regular participant in the discussions at the Yeshivot of Sura and Mahuza.
- Rabbi Abbahu (d. early 4th century), disciple of Rabbi Yochanan. Dean of the Yeshiva in Caesarea.
- Hamnuna — Several rabbis in the Talmud bore this name, the most well-known being a disciple of Shmuel (fl. late 3rd century).
- Judah III (d. early 4th century), disciple of Rabbi Johanan bar Nappaha. Son and successor of Gamaliel IV as NASI, and grandson of Judah II.
- Rabbi Ammi
- Rabbi Assi
- Hanina ben Pappa
- Raba bar Rav Huna
- Rami bar Hama
- Rav Shmuel bar Yehudah
- Rav Kruspedai (כרוספדאי; referred to in the Jerusalem Talmud as קריספא), student of Rabbi Yochanan.
- Rav Avya

=== Fourth generation (approx. 320–350 CE) ===
- Abaye (d. 339), disciple of Rabbah, Rav Yosef, and Rav Nachman. Dean of the Yeshiva in Pumbedita.
- Abba b. Bizna, haggadist
- Rava (d. 352), disciple of Rabbah, Rav Yosef, and Rav Nachman, and possibly Rabbi Yochanan. Dean of the Yeshiva at Mahuza.
- Hillel II (fl. c. 360). Creator of the present-day Hebrew calendar. Son and successor as Nasi of Judah Nesiah, grandson of Gamaliel IV.
- Abba the Surgeon
- Bebai ben Abaye (fl. c. 4th century)
- Berakhiah

=== Fifth generation (approx. 350–371 CE) ===
- Rav Nachman bar Yitzchak (d. 356), disciple of Abaye and Rava. Dean of the Yeshiva at Pumbedita.
- Rav Papa (d. 371 or 375), disciple of Abaye and Rava. Dean of the Yeshiva at Naresh.
- Rav Kahana, teacher of Rav Ashi
- Rav Mesharshiya, student of Rava, son-in-law of Rav Kahana; colleague of Rav Papa.
- Rav Hama
- Rav Huna berai d'Rav Yehoshua

=== Sixth generation (approx. 371–427 CE) ===
- Rav Ashi (d. 427), disciple of Rav Kahana. Dean of the Yeshiva in Mata Mehasia. Primary redactor of the Babylonian Talmud.
- Ravina I (d. 421), disciple of Abaye and Rava. Colleague of Rav Ashi in the Yeshiva at Mata Mehasia, where he assisted in the redaction of the Babylonian Talmud.

=== Seventh generation (approx. 425–460 CE) ===
- Mar bar Rav Ashi.

=== Eighth generation (approx. 460–500 CE) ===
- Ravina II (d. 475 or 500), disciple of Ravina I and Rav Ashi. Dean of the Yeshiva at Sura. Completed the redaction of the Babylonian Talmud.

== Stammaim ==
Stammaim is a term used by some modern scholars, such as David Weiss Halivni, for the rabbis who composed the anonymous (stam) statements and arguments in the Talmud, some of whom may have worked during the period of the Amoraim, but who mostly made their contributions after the amoraic period. See also Savoraim.
