= Behaalotecha =

Weekly Torah reading

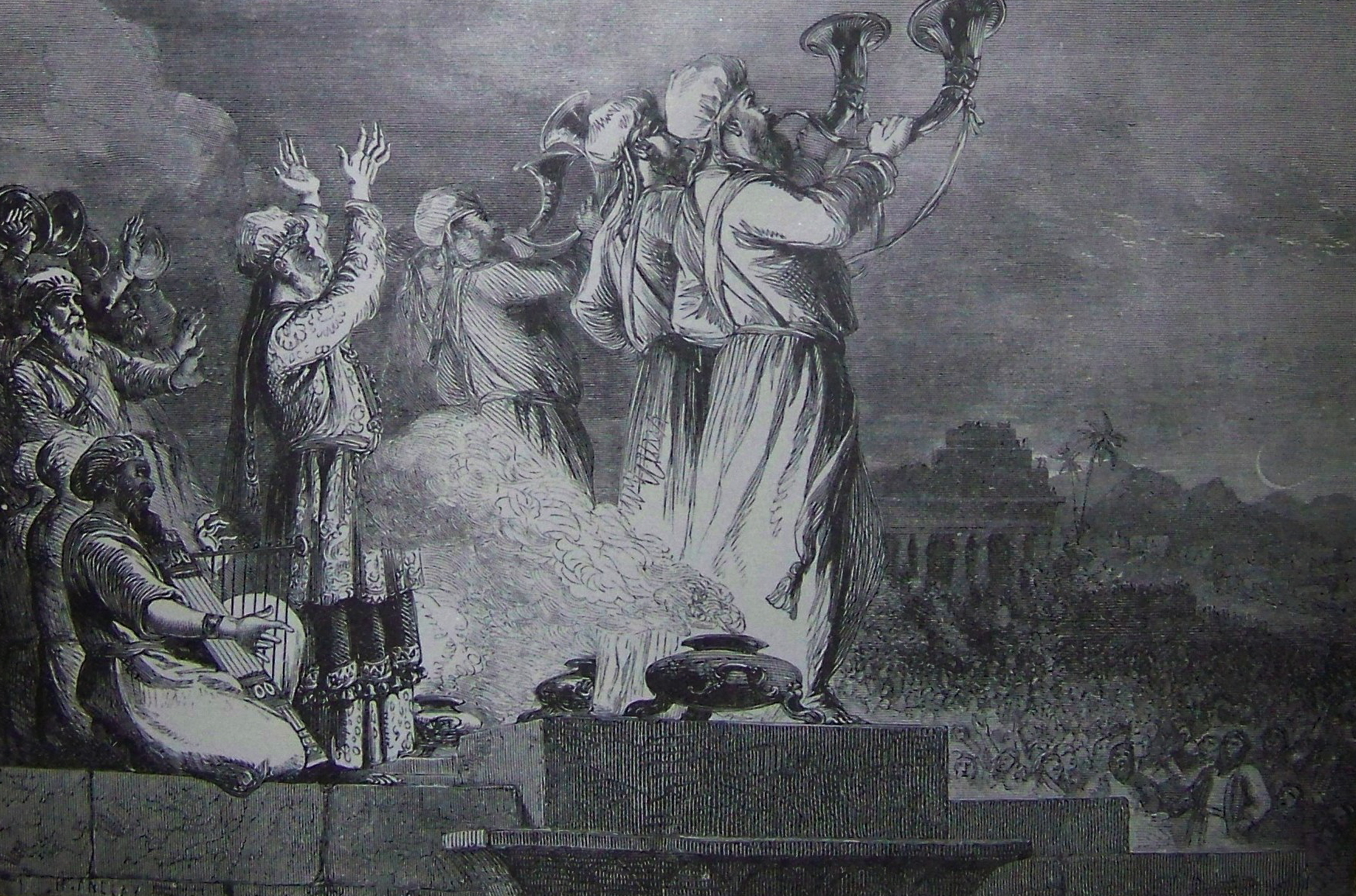
Blowing the Trumpet at the Feast of the New Moon (illustration from the 1890 Holman Bible)

Behaalotecha, Behaalotcha, Beha'alotecha, Beha'alotcha, Beha'alothekha, or Behaaloscha (בְּהַעֲלֹתְךָ—Hebrew for "when you set up," the 11th word, and the first distinctive word, in the parashah) is the 36th weekly Torah portion (פָּרָשָׁה, parashah) in the annual Jewish cycle of Torah reading and the third in the Book of Numbers. The parashah tells of the Menorah in the Tabernacle, the consecration of the Levites, the Second Passover, how pillars of cloud and fire led the Israelites, the silver trumpets, how the Israelites set out on their journeys, the complaints of the Israelites, and how Miriam and Aaron spoke lashon hara about Moses. The parashah comprises Numbers 8:1–12:16. It is made up of 7,055 Hebrew letters, 1,840 Hebrew words, 136 verses, and 240 lines in a Torah Scroll (סֵפֶר תּוֹרָה, Sefer Torah).

Jews generally read it in late May or in June. As the parashah sets out some of the laws of Passover, Jews also read part of the parashah, Numbers 9:1–14, as the initial Torah reading for the last intermediate day (חוֹל הַמּוֹעֵד, Chol HaMoed) of Passover.

== Readings ==
In traditional Sabbath Torah reading, the parashah is divided into seven readings, or עליות, aliyot.

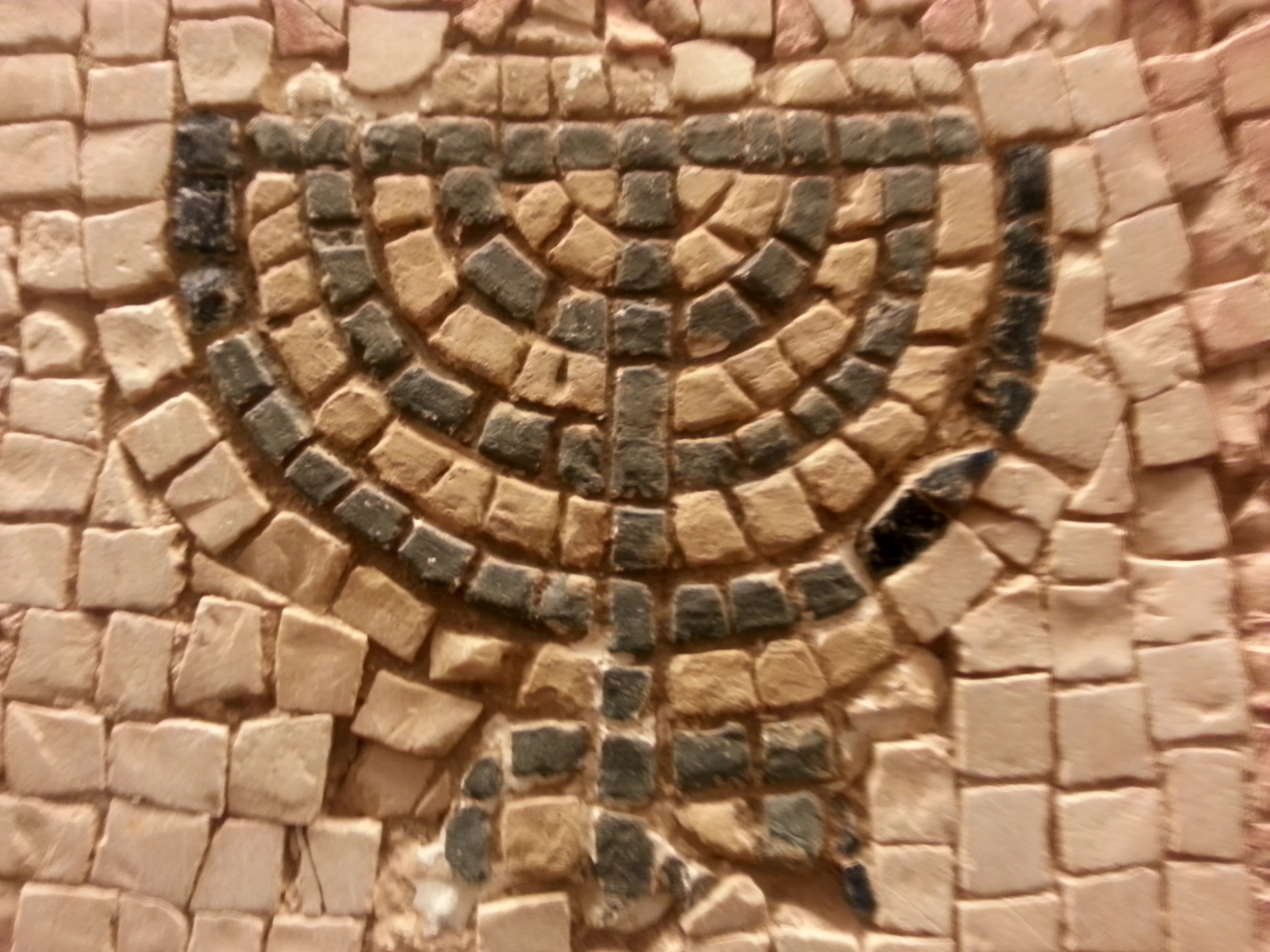
The Menorah (Byzantine mosaic in Israel)

=== First reading—Numbers 8:1–14 ===
In the first reading, God told Moses to tell Aaron to mount the seven lamps so as to give light to the front of the Menorah in the Tabernacle, and Aaron did so. God told Moses to cleanse the Levites by sprinkling on them water of purification, and making them shave their whole bodies and wash their clothes. Moses was to assemble the Israelites around the Levites and cause the Israelites to lay their hands on the Levites. Aaron was to designate the Levites as a wave offering from the Israelites. The Levites were then to lay their hands in turn on the heads of two bulls, one as a sin offering and the other as a burnt offering, to make expiation for the Levites.

=== Second reading—Numbers 8:15–26 ===
In the second reading, the Levites were qualified for the service of the Tent of Meeting, in place of the firstborn of the Israelites. God told Moses that Levites aged 25 to 50 were to work in the service of the Tent of Meeting, but after age 50 they were to retire and could stand guard but not perform labor.

=== Third reading—Numbers 9:1–14 ===
In the third reading, at the beginning of the second year following the Exodus from Egypt, God told Moses to have the Israelites celebrate Passover at its set time. But some were unclean because they had had contact with a corpse and could not offer the Passover sacrifice on the set day. They asked Moses and Aaron how they could participate in Passover, and Moses told them to stand by while he listened for God's instructions. God told Moses that whenever Israelites were defiled by a corpse or on a long journey on Passover, they were to offer the Passover offering on the 14th day of the second month—a month after Passover—otherwise in strict accord with the law of the Passover sacrifice. But those who were clean and not on a journey refrained from offering the Passover sacrifice were to be cut off from their kin.

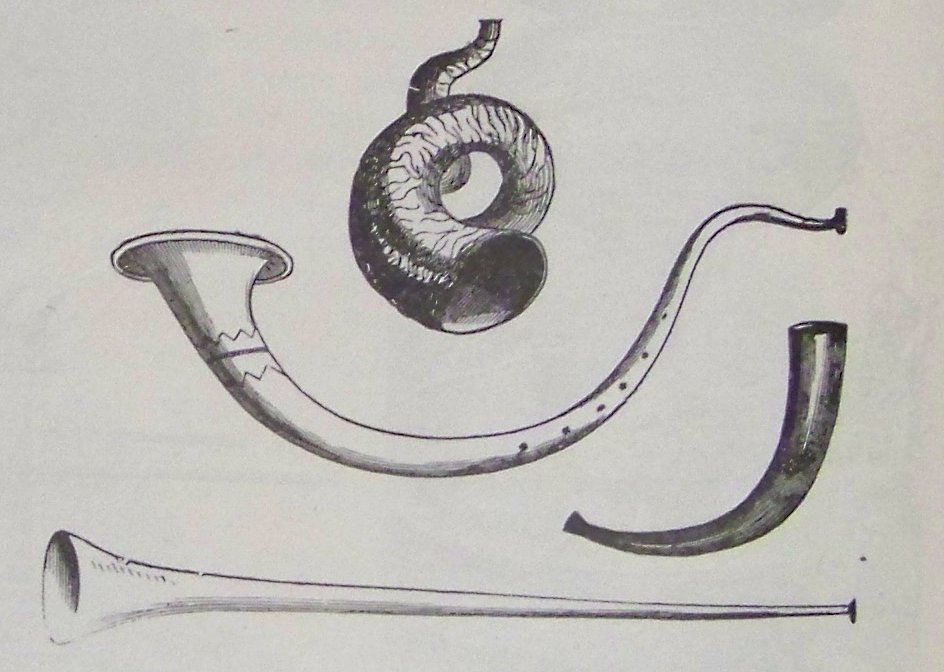
Trumpets (illustration from the 1890 Holman Bible)

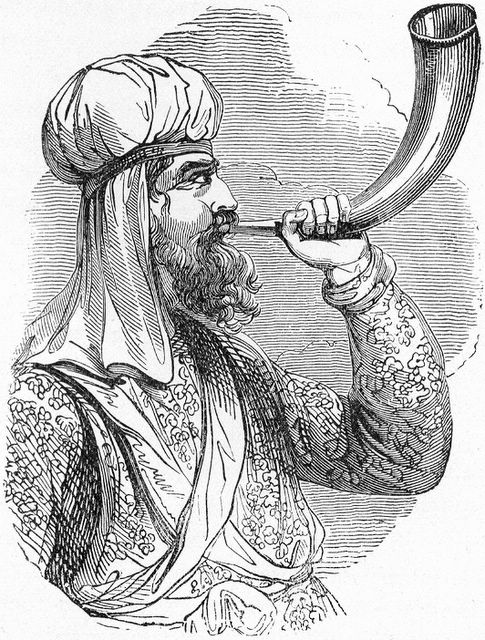
Feast of Trumpets (illustration from the 1894 Treasures of the Bible)

=== Fourth reading—Numbers 9:15–10:10 ===
In the fourth reading, starting the day that the Tabernacle was set up, a cloud covered the Tabernacle by day, and a fire rested on it by night. Whenever the cloud lifted from the Tent, the Israelites would follow it until the cloud settled, and there the Israelites would make camp and stay as long as the cloud lingered. God told Moses to have two silver trumpets made to summon the community and to set it in motion. Upon long blasts of the two horns, the whole community was to assemble before the entrance of the Tent of Meeting. Upon the blast of one, the chieftains were to assemble. Short blasts directed the divisions encamped on the east to move forward, and a second set of short blasts directed those on the south to move forward. As well, short blasts were to be sounded when the Israelites were at war against an aggressor who attacked them, and the trumpets were to be sounded on joyous occasions, festivals, new moons, burnt offerings, and sacrifices of well-being.

=== Fifth reading—Numbers 10:11–34 ===
In the fifth reading, in the second month of the second year, the cloud lifted from the Tabernacle and the Israelites set out on their journeys from the wilderness of Sinai to the wilderness of Paran. Moses asked Hobab son of Reuel (elsewhere called Jethro) the Midianite to come with the Israelites, promising to be generous with him, but he replied that he would return to his native land. Moses pressed him again, noting that he could serve as the Israelites' guide. They marched three days distance from Mount Sinai, with the Ark of the Covenant in front of them, and God's cloud above them by day.

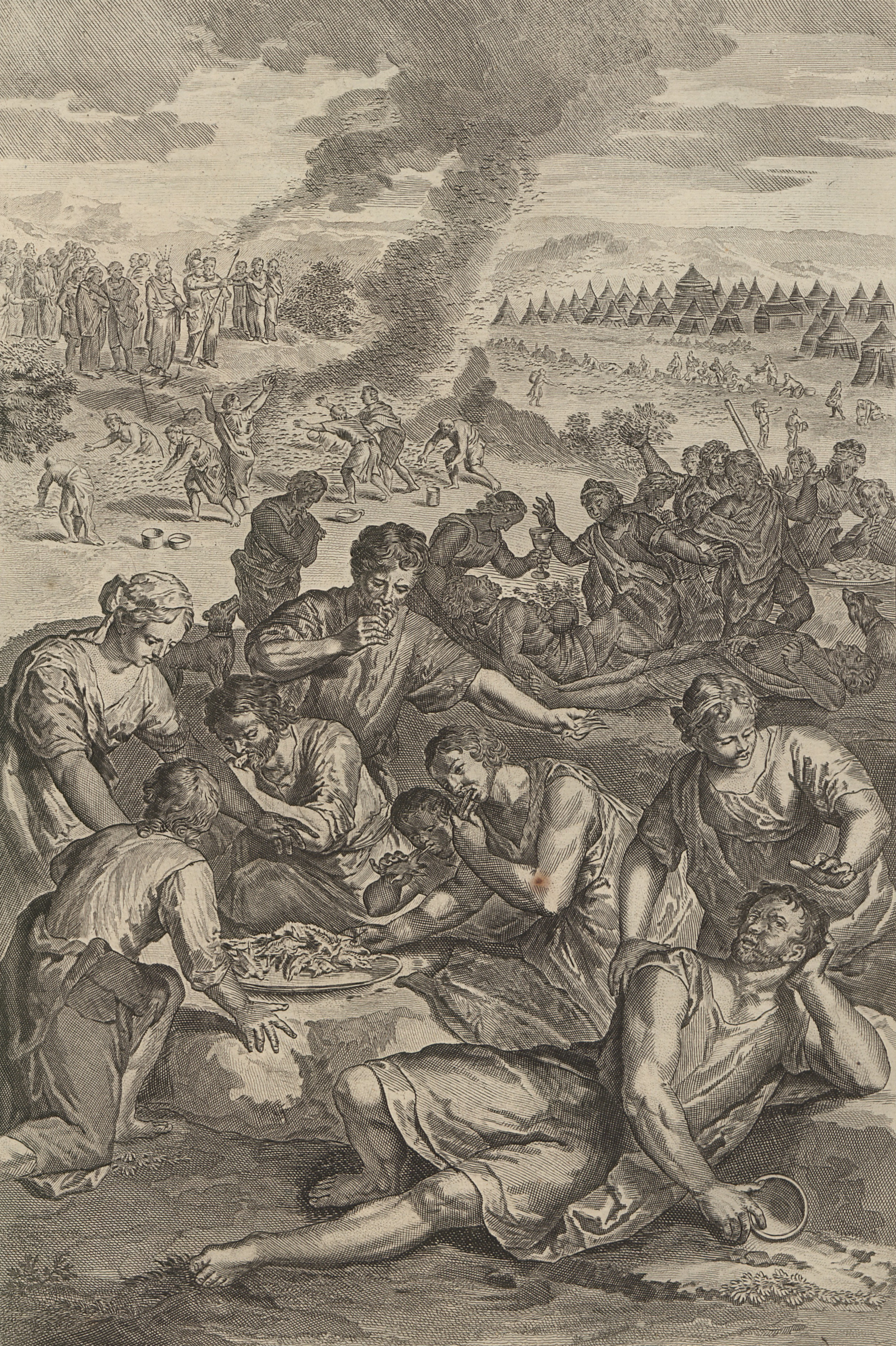
A Plague Inflicted on Israel While Eating the Quail (illustration from the 1728 Figures de la Bible)

=== Sixth reading—Numbers 10:35–11:29 ===
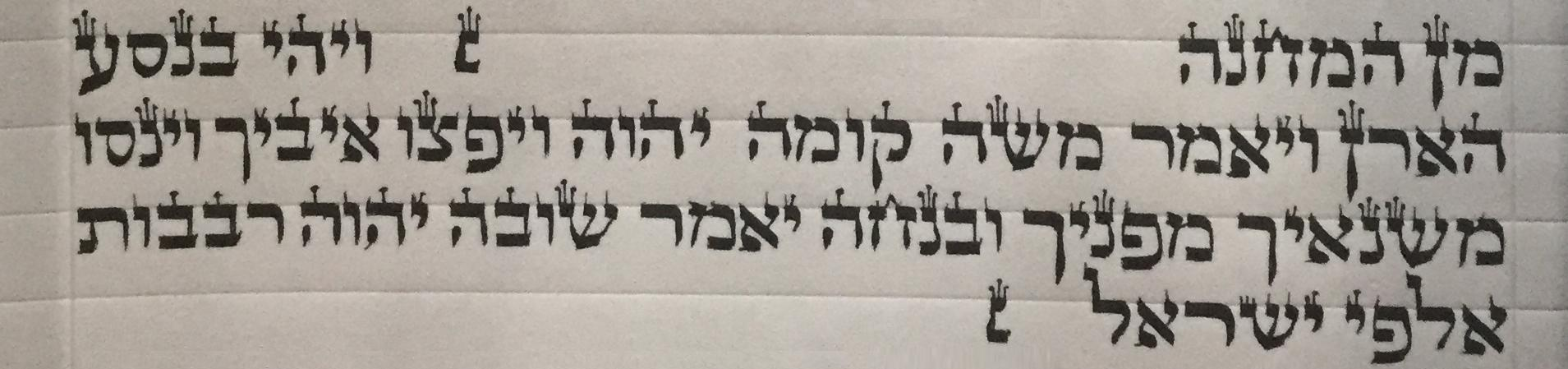
The two verses Numbers 10:35–36 separated by inverted נ's.

The sixth reading records two prayers of Moses: when the Ark was to set out, Moses would say: "Advance, O Lord! May Your enemies be scattered, and may Your foes flee before You!" and when it halted, he would say: "Return, O Lord, You who are Israel's myriads of thousands!" In a scroll, these two verses are buttressed by inverted/backward נ's.

The people took to complaining bitterly before God, and at Taberah God ravaged the outskirts of the camp with fire until Moses prayed, and then the fire died down. The riffraff in their midst (אסַפְסֻף, asafsuf—compare the "mixed multitude," עֵרֶב רַב, erev rav of Exodus 12:38) felt a gluttonous craving and the Israelites complained, "If only we had meat to eat! Moses in turn complained to God, "Why have You… laid the burden of all this people on me? God told Moses to gather 70 elders, so that God could come down and put some of the spirit that rested on Moses on them, so that they might share the burden of the people. And God told Moses to tell the people to purify themselves, for the next day they would eat meat. But Moses questioned how enough flocks, herds, or fish could be found to feed 600,000. God answered: "Is there a limit to the Lord's power?" Moses gathered the 70 elders, and God came down in a cloud, spoke to Moses, and drew on the spirit that was on Moses and put it on the elders. When the spirit rested on them, they spoke in ecstasy, but did not continue. Eldad and Medad had remained in camp, yet the spirit rested on them, and they spoke in ecstasy in the camp. When a youth reported to Moses that Eldad and Medad were acting the prophet in the camp, Joshua called on Moses to restrain them. But Moses told Joshua: "Would that all the Lord's people were prophets, that the Lord put His spirit on them!"

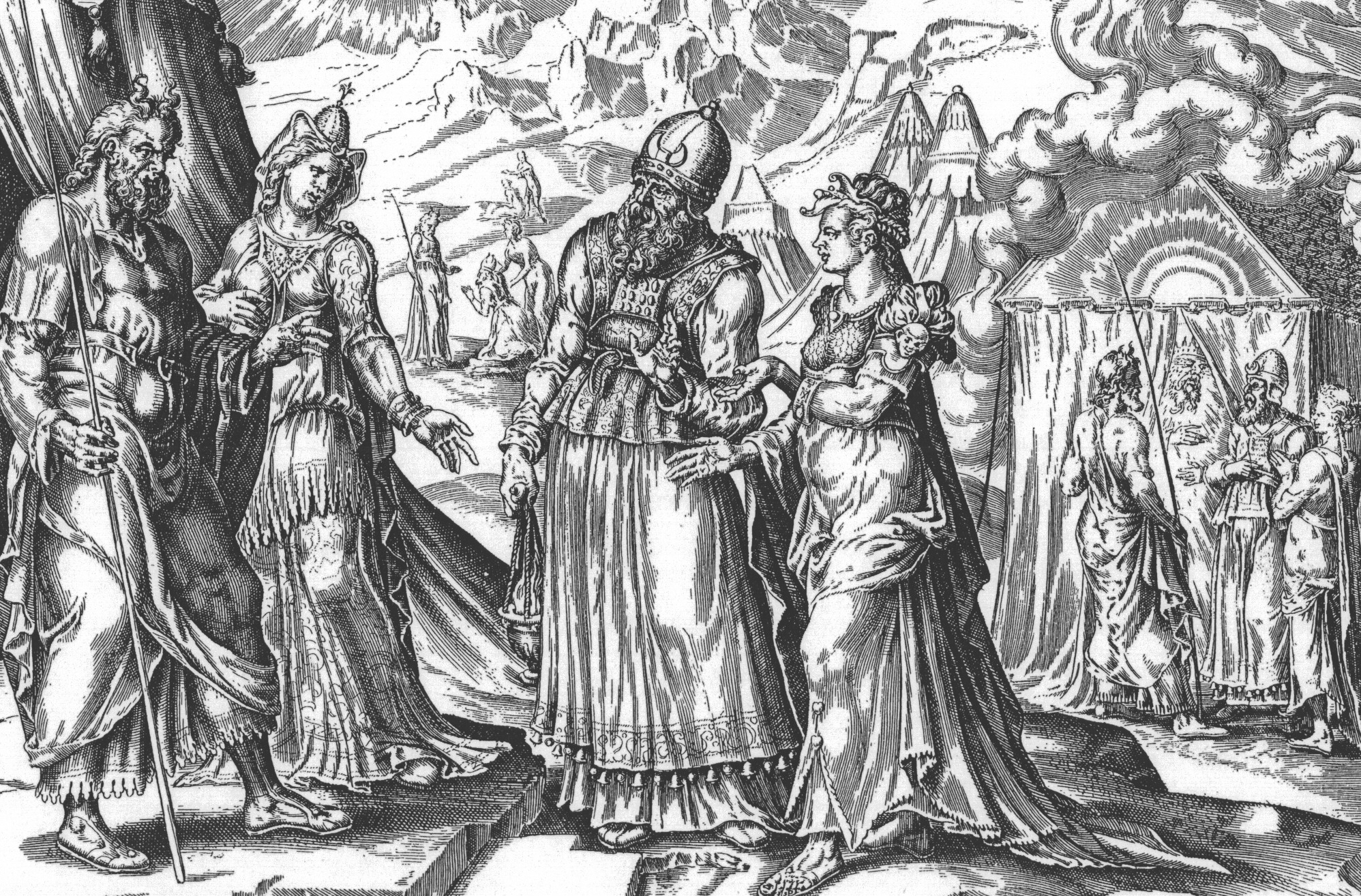
Miriam and Aaron complain against Moses (illustration from the 1908 The Bible and Its Story Taught by One Thousand Picture Lessons)

=== Seventh reading—Numbers 11:30–12:16 ===
In the seventh reading, a wind from God then swept quail from the sea and strewed them all around the camp at a place called Kibroth Hattaavah (Graves of Craving), and the people gathered quail for two days. While the meat was still between their teeth, God struck the people with a plague.

Miriam and Aaron spoke against Moses, saying: "He married a Cushite woman!" and "Has the Lord spoken only through Moses? Has He not spoken through us as well?" God heard and called Moses, Aaron, and Miriam to come to the Tent of Meeting. God came down in cloud and called out to Aaron and Miriam: "When a prophet of the Lord arises among you, I make Myself known to him in a vision, I speak with him in a dream. Not so with My servant Moses; he is trusted throughout My household. With him I speak mouth to mouth, plainly and not in riddles, and he beholds the likeness of the Lord. How then did you not shrink from speaking against My servant Moses!" As the cloud withdrew, Miriam was stricken with snow-white scales. Moses cried out to God, "O God, pray heal her!" But God said to Moses, "If her father spat in her face, would she not bear her shame for seven days? Let her be shut out of camp for seven days." And the people waited until she rejoined the camp.

=== Readings according to the triennial cycle ===
Jews who read the Torah according to the triennial cycle of Torah reading read the parashah according to the following schedule:

	Year 1	Year 2	Year 3
	2026, 2029, 2032 ...	2027, 2030, 2033 ...	2028, 2031, 2034 ...
Reading	8:1–9:14	9:15–10:34	10:35–12:16
1	8:1–4	9:15–18	10:35–11:9
2	8:5–9	9:19–23	11:10–18
3	8:10–14	10:1–7	11:19–22
4	8:15–22	10:8–10	11:23–29
5	8:23–26	10:11–20	11:30–35
6	9:1–8	10:21–28	12:1–13
7	9:9–14	10:29–34	12:14–16
Maftir	9:12–14	10:32–34	12:14–16

== In inner-Biblical interpretation ==
The parashah has parallels or is discussed in these Biblical sources:

=== Numbers chapter 8 ===
This is the pattern of instruction and construction of the Tabernacle and its furnishings:

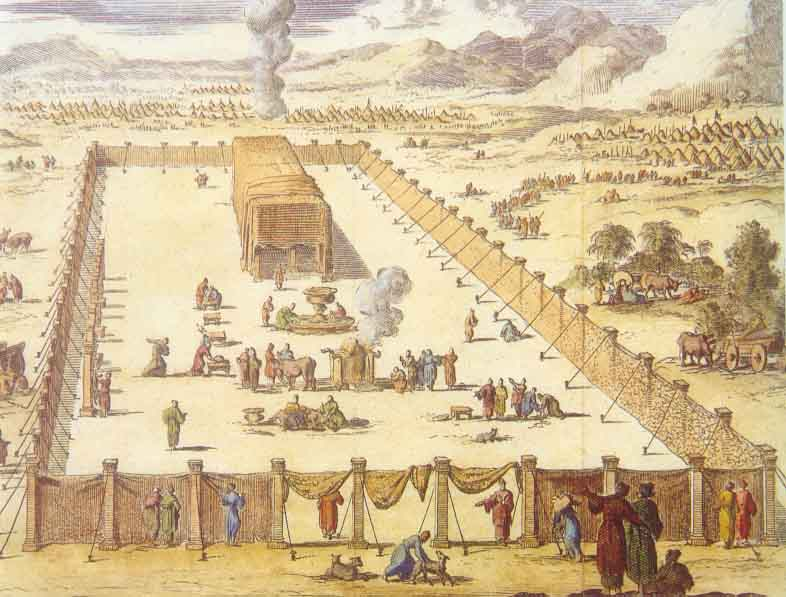
The Tabernacle

Item	Instruction		Construction	
Item	Order	Verses	Order	Verses
The Sabbath	16	Exodus 31:12–17	1	Exodus 35:1–3
Contributions	1	Exodus 25:1–9	2	Exodus 35:4–29
Craftspeople	15	Exodus 31:1–11	3	Exodus 35:30–36:7
Tabernacle	5	Exodus 26:1–37	4	Exodus 36:8–38
Ark	2	Exodus 25:10–22	5	Exodus 37:1–9
Table	3	Exodus 25:23–30	6	Exodus 37:10–16
Menorah	4	Exodus 25:31–40	7	Exodus 37:17–24
Altar of Incense	11	Exodus 30:1–10	8	Exodus 37:25–28
Anointing Oil	13	Exodus 30:22–33	9	Exodus 37:29
Incense	14	Exodus 30:34–38	10	Exodus 37:29
Altar of Sacrifice	6	Exodus 27:1–8	11	Exodus 38:1–7
Laver	12	Exodus 30:17–21	12	Exodus 38:8
Tabernacle Court	7	Exodus 27:9–19	13	Exodus 38:9–20
Priestly Garments	9	Exodus 28:1–43	14	Exodus 39:1–31
Ordination Ritual	10	Exodus 29:1–46	15	Leviticus 8:1–9:24
Menorah	8	Exodus 27:20–21	16	Numbers 8:1–4

Exodus 25:31–40 describes the Menorah to which Numbers 8:1–4 refers.

Gordon Wenham noted these dated events in the second year after the Exodus:

Date	Event (in main chronology)	Verse	Event (in Numbers 7:1–9:15 digression)	Verse
1st month, 1st day	Tabernacle erected	Exodus 40:2	Tabernacle erected	Numbers 7:1
	Laws from Tabernacle began	Leviticus 1:1	Offerings for the Altar began	Numbers 7:3
	Ordination of priests began	Leviticus 8:1		
1st month, 8th day	Ordination completed	Leviticus 9:1		
	Nadab and Abihu died	Leviticus 10:1–3		
1st month, 12th day			Offerings for the Altar ended	Numbers 7:78
			Appointment of the Levites	Numbers 8:5
1st month, 14th day			Second Passover	Numbers 9:2
2nd month, 1st day	Census began	Numbers 1:1		
2nd month, 14th day			Delayed Passover	Numbers 9:11
2nd month, 20th day	Cloud moved	Numbers 10:11		

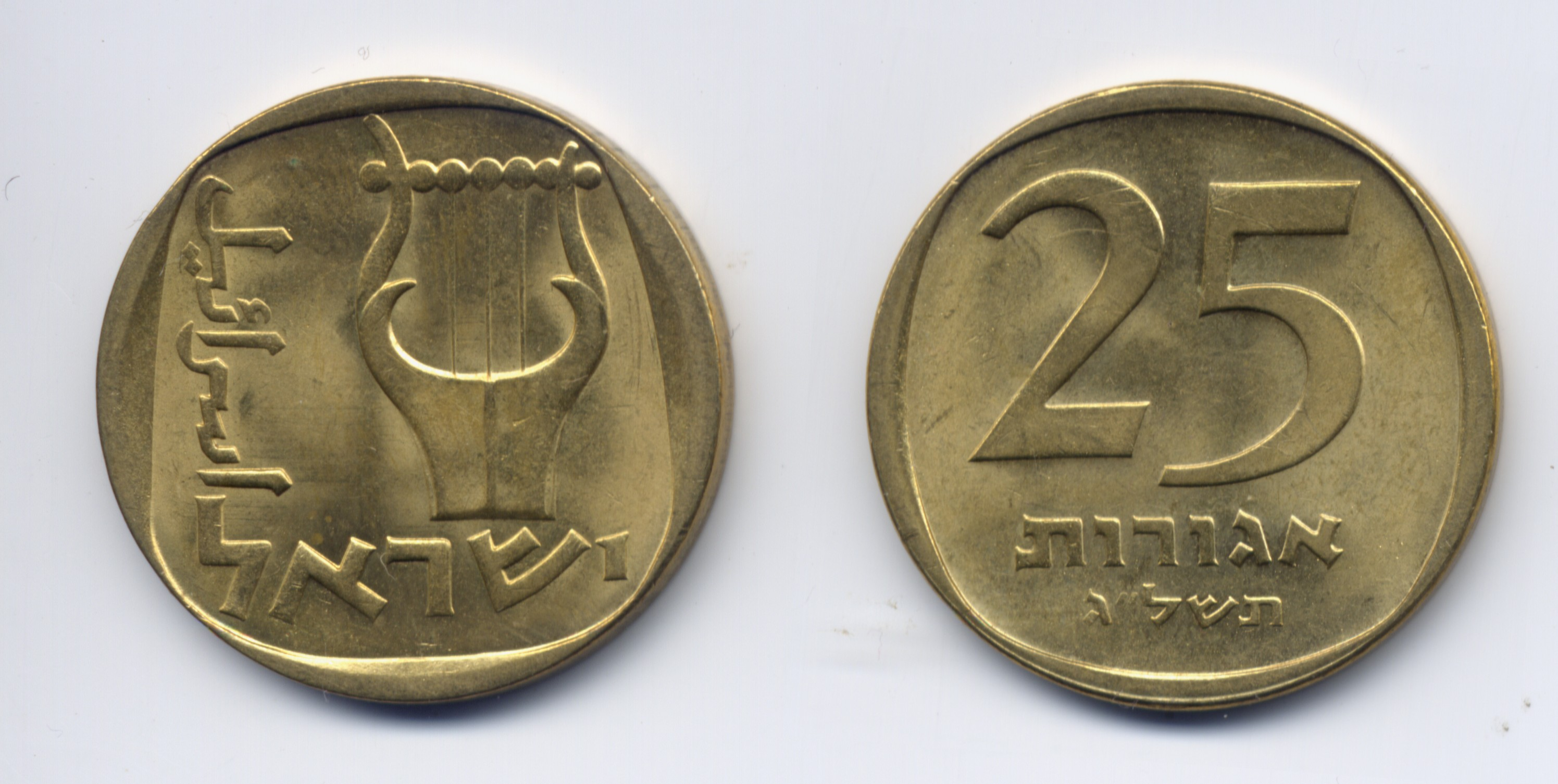
A lyre on an Israeli coin

Numbers 8:13–19 refers to duties of the Levites. Deuteronomy 33:10 reports that Levites taught the law. Deuteronomy 17:9–10 reports that they served as judges. And Deuteronomy 10:8 reports that they blessed God's name. 1 Chronicles 23:3–5 reports that of 38,000 Levite men aged 30 and up, 24,000 were in charge of the work of the Temple in Jerusalem, 6,000 were officers and magistrates, 4,000 were gatekeepers, and 4,000 praised God with instruments and song. 1 Chronicles 15:16 reports that King David installed Levites as singers with musical instruments, harps, lyres, and cymbals, and 1 Chronicles 16:4 reports that David appointed Levites to minister before the Ark, to invoke, to praise, and to extol God. And 2 Chronicles 5:12 reports at the inauguration of Solomon's Temple, Levites sang dressed in fine linen, holding cymbals, harps, and lyres, to the east of the altar, and with them 120 priests blew trumpets. 2 Chronicles 20:19 reports that Levites of the sons of Kehath and of the sons of Korah extolled God in song. Eleven psalms identify themselves as of the Korahites.

=== Numbers chapter 9 ===
==== Passover ====
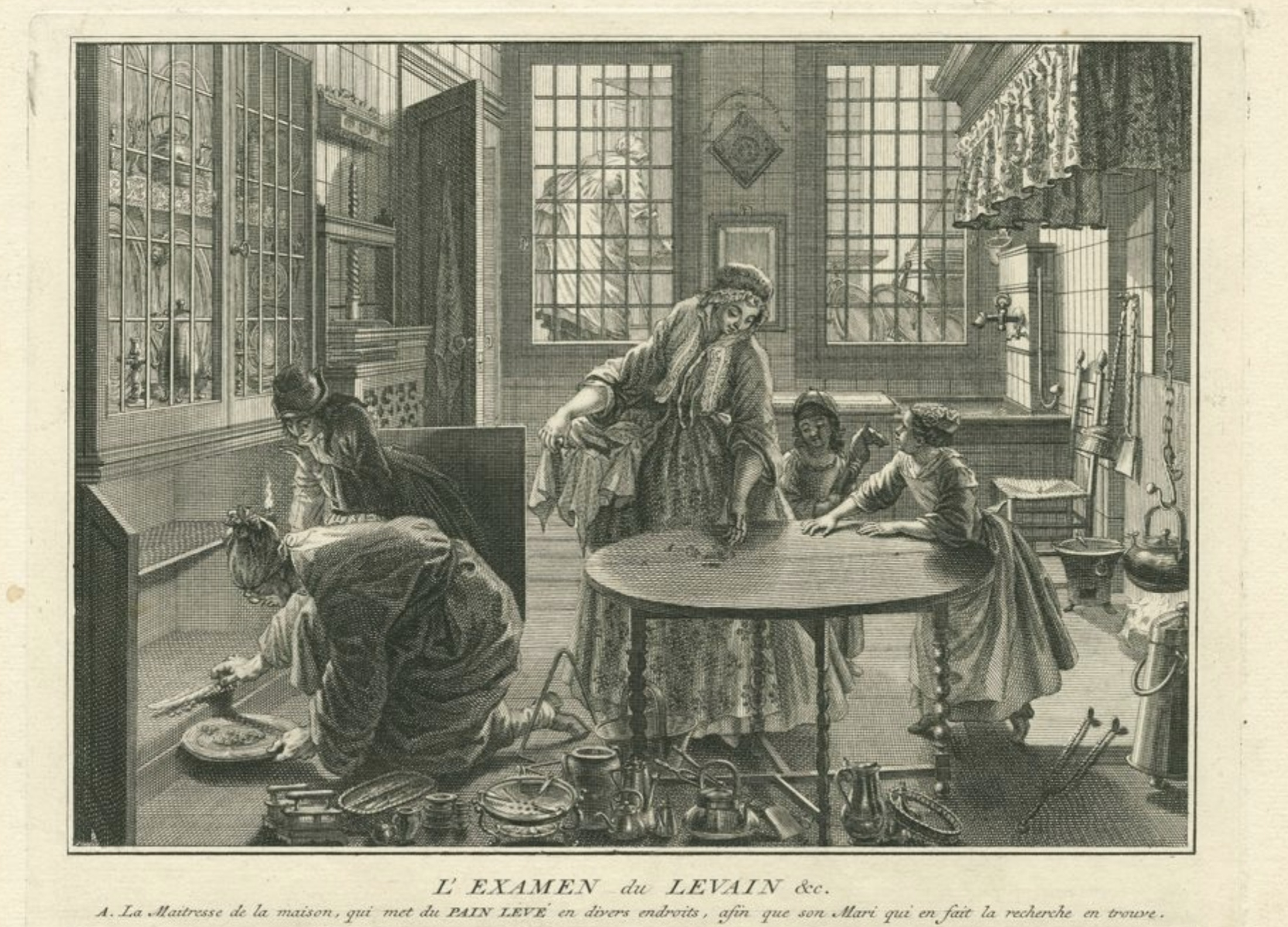
The Search for Leaven (illustration circa 1733–1739 by Bernard Picart)

Numbers 9:1–14 refers to the festival of Passover. In the Hebrew Bible, Passover is called:

- "Passover" (פֶּסַח, Pesach);
- "The Feast of Unleavened Bread" (חַג הַמַּצּוֹת, Chag haMatzot); and
- "A holy convocation" or "a solemn assembly" (מִקְרָא-קֹדֶשׁ, mikrah kodesh).

Some explain the double nomenclature of "Passover" and "Feast of Unleavened Bread" as referring to two separate feasts that the Israelites combined sometime between the Exodus and when the Biblical text became settled. Exodus 34:18–20 and Deuteronomy 15:19–16:8 indicate that the dedication of the firstborn also became associated with the festival.

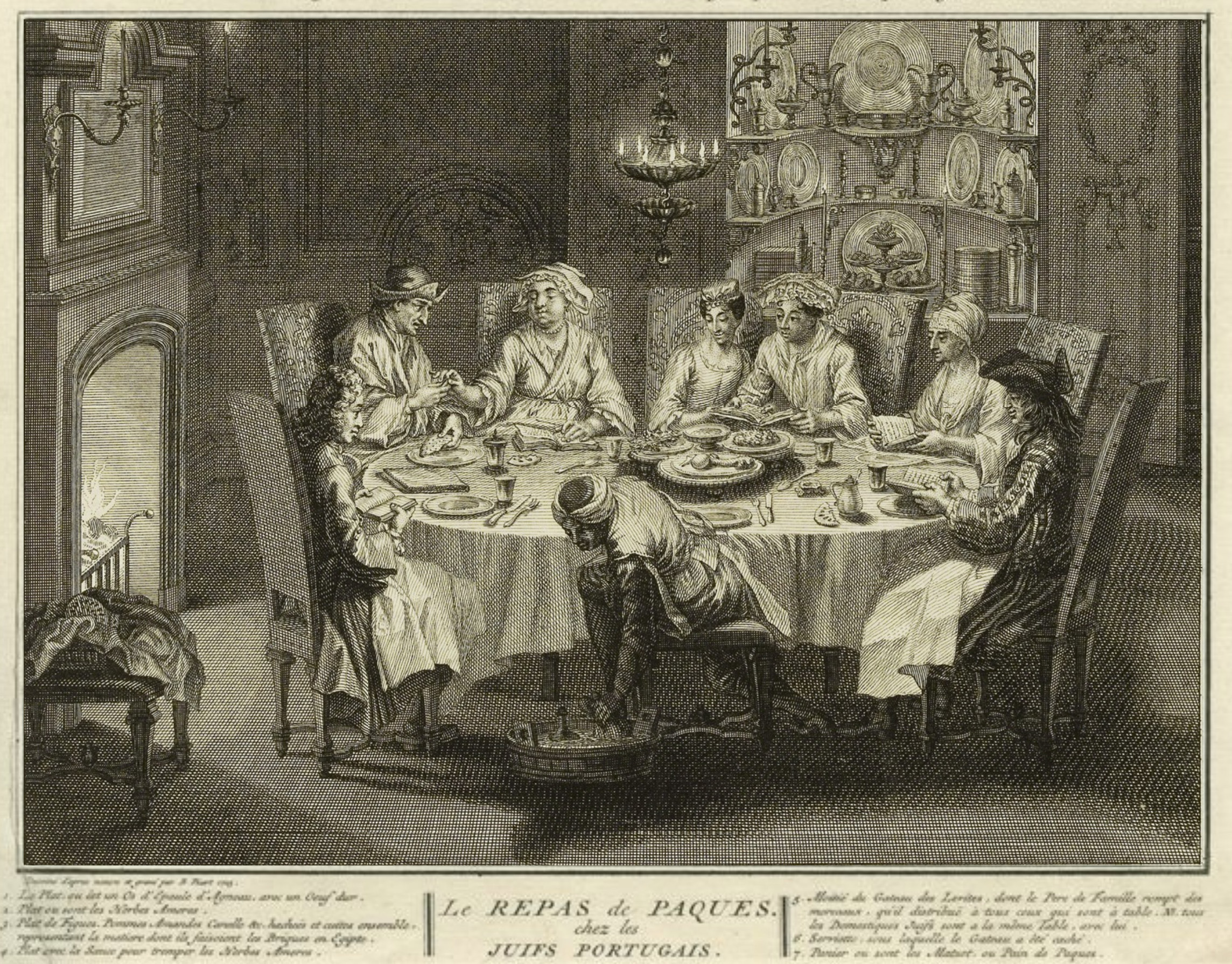
The Passover Seder of the Portuguese Jews (illustration circa 1733–1739 by Bernard Picart)

Some believe that the "Feast of Unleavened Bread" was an agricultural festival at which the Israelites celebrated the beginning of the grain harvest. Moses may have had this festival in mind when in Exodus 5:1 and 10:9 he petitioned Pharaoh to let the Israelites go to celebrate a feast in the wilderness.

"Passover," on the other hand, was associated with a thanksgiving sacrifice of a lamb, also called "the Passover," "the Passover lamb," or "the Passover offering."

Exodus 12:5–6, Leviticus 23:5, and Numbers 9:3 and 5, and 28:16 direct "Passover" to take place on the evening of the fourteenth of אָבִיב, Aviv (נִיסָן, Nisan in the Hebrew calendar after the Babylonian captivity). Joshua 5:10, Ezekiel 45:21, Ezra 6:19, and 2 Chronicles 35:1 confirm that practice. Exodus 12:18–19, 23:15, and 34:18, Leviticus 23:6, and Ezekiel 45:21 direct the "Feast of Unleavened Bread" to take place over seven days and Leviticus 23:6 and Ezekiel 45:21 direct that it begin on the fifteenth of the month. Some believe that the propinquity of the dates of the two festivals led to their confusion and merger.

Exodus 12:23 and 27 link the word "Passover" (פֶּסַח, Pesach) to God's act to "pass over" (פָסַח, pasach) the Israelites' houses in the plague of the firstborn. In the Torah, the consolidated Passover and Feast of Unleavened Bread thus commemorate the Israelites' liberation from Egypt.

The Hebrew Bible frequently notes the Israelites' observance of Passover at turning points in their history. Numbers 9:1–5 reports God's direction to the Israelites to observe Passover in the wilderness of Sinai on the anniversary of their liberation from Egypt. Joshua 5:10–11 reports that upon entering the Promised Land, the Israelites kept the Passover on the plains of Jericho and ate unleavened cakes and parched corn, produce of the land, the next day. 2 Kings 23:21–23 reports that King Josiah commanded the Israelites to keep the Passover in Jerusalem as part of Josiah's reforms, but also notes that the Israelites had not kept such a Passover from the days of the Biblical judges nor in all the days of the kings of Israel or the kings of Judah, calling into question the observance of even Kings David and Solomon. The more reverent 2 Chronicles 8:12–13, however, reports that Solomon offered sacrifices on the festivals, including the Feast of Unleavened Bread. And 2 Chronicles 30:1–27 reports King Hezekiah's observance of a second Passover anew, as enough of neither the priests nor the people were prepared to do so before then. And Ezra 6:19–22 reports that the Israelites returned from the Babylonian captivity observed Passover, ate the Passover lamb, and kept the Feast of Unleavened Bread seven days with joy.

=== Numbers chapter 10 ===
God's command to set out from Sinai in Numbers 10:11–13 is recalled by Moses in Deuteronomy 1:6–8.

In Numbers 10:9, the Israelites were instructed to blow on their trumpets to be "remembered before the Lord" and delivered from their enemies. Remembrance is a prominent biblical topic: God remembered Noah to deliver him from the flood in Genesis 8:1; God promised to remember God's covenant not to destroy the Earth again by flood in Genesis 9:15–16; God remembered Abraham to deliver Lot from the destruction of Sodom and Gomorrah in Genesis 19:29; God remembered Rachel to deliver her from childlessness in Genesis 30:22; God remembered God's covenant with Abraham, Isaac, and Jacob to deliver the Israelites from Egyptian bondage in Exodus 2:24 and 6:5–6; Moses called on God to remember God's covenant with Abraham, Isaac, and Jacob to deliver the Israelites from God's wrath after the incident of the Golden Calf in Exodus 32:13 and Deuteronomy 9:27; God promised to remember God's covenant with Jacob, Isaac, and Abraham to deliver the Israelites and the Land of Israel in Leviticus 26:42–45; Samson called on God to deliver him from the Philistines in Judges 16:28; Hannah prayed for God to remember her and deliver her from childlessness in 1 Samuel 1:11 and God remembered Hannah's prayer to deliver her from childlessness in 1 Samuel 1:19; Hezekiah called on God to remember Hezekiah's faithfulness to deliver him from sickness in 2 Kings 20:3 and Isaiah 38:3; Jeremiah called on God to remember God's covenant with the Israelites to not condemn them in Jeremiah 14:21; Jeremiah called on God to remember him and think of him, and avenge him of his persecutors in Jeremiah 15:15; God promised to remember God's covenant with the Israelites and establish an everlasting covenant in Ezekiel 16:60; God remembers the cry of the humble in Zion to avenge them in Psalm 9:13; David called on God to remember God's compassion and mercy in Psalm 25:6; Asaph called on God to remember God's congregation to deliver them from their enemies in Psalm 74:2; God remembered that the Israelites were only human in Psalm 78:39; Ethan the Ezrahite called on God to remember how short Ethan's life was in Psalm 89:48; God remembers that humans are but dust in Psalm 103:14; God remembers God's covenant with Abraham, Isaac, and Jacob in Psalm 105:8–10; God remembers God's word to Abraham to deliver the Israelites to the Land of Israel in Psalm 105:42–44; the Psalmist calls on God to remember him to favor God's people, to think of him at God's salvation, that he might behold the prosperity of God's people in Psalm 106:4–5; God remembered God's covenant and repented according to God's mercy to deliver the Israelites in the wake of their rebellion and iniquity in Psalm 106:4–5; the Psalmist calls on God to remember God's word to God's servant to give him hope in Psalm 119:49; God remembered us in our low estate to deliver us from our adversaries in Psalm 136:23–24; Job called on God to remember him to deliver him from God's wrath in Job 14:13; Nehemiah prayed to God to remember God's promise to Moses to deliver the Israelites from exile in Nehemiah 1:8; and Nehemiah prayed to God to remember him to deliver him for good in Nehemiah 13:14–31.

The Wilderness of Paran, mentioned in Numbers 10:12, was the limit of the territory attacked by Chedorlaomer and his alliance during the time of Abraham, and it was the place where Abraham's second wife Hagar and their first-born son Ishmael were sent into exile from Abraham's dwelling in Beersheba.

Numbers 10 does not record Hobab's response to Moses' request in Numbers 10:31–32 that he come with the Israelites, but Judges 1:16 indicates he did accede.

Numbers 10:35 reports that "when the Ark set out, Moses said: 'Rise up, O Lord, and let Your enemies be scattered; and let them that hate You flee before You.'" Exemplifying this power of the Ark, 1 Samuel 4–6 tells how the Israelites carried the Ark into battle against superior Philistine forces, believing that they thereby brought God's presence into the battle.

=== Numbers chapter 12 ===
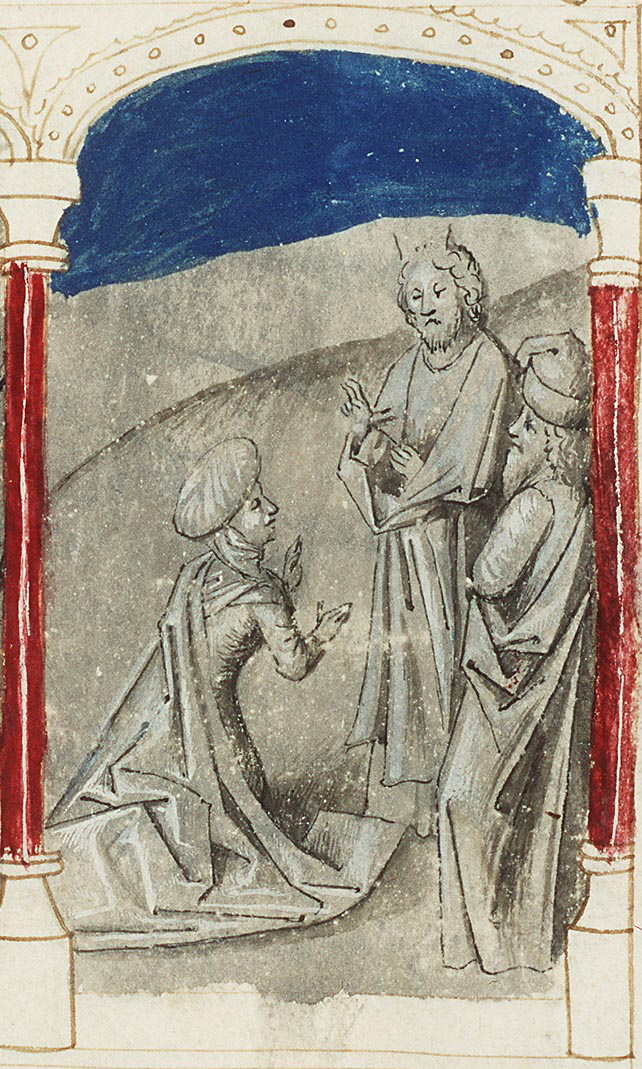
Moses Prays for Miriam To Be Healed (illumination circa 1450–1455 by Hesdin of Amiens from a Biblia pauperum)

Numbers 12:1 reports that Miriam and Aaron spoke against Moses because he married a Cushite woman. Exodus 2:16–21 recounts that Moses married Zipporah, a Midianite. Habakkuk 3:7 seems to equate Cushan with Midian. Genesis 10:6 identifies Cush as a son of Ham.

God's reference to Moses as "my servant" (עַבְדִּי, avdi) in Numbers 12:7 and 12:8 echoes God's application of the same term to Abraham. And later, God used the term to refer to Caleb, Moses, David, Isaiah, Eliakim, son of Hilkiah, Israel, Nebuchadnezzar, Zerubbabel, the Branch, and Job.

The Hebrew Bible reports skin disease (צָּרַעַת, tzara'at) and a person affected by skin disease (מְּצֹרָע, metzora) at several places, often (and sometimes incorrectly) translated as "leprosy" and "a leper." In Exodus 4:6, to help Moses to convince others that God had sent him, God instructed Moses to put his hand into his bosom, and when he took it out, his hand was "leprous (מְצֹרַעַת, m'tzora'at), as white as snow." In Leviticus 13–14, the Torah sets out regulations for skin disease (צָרַעַת, tzara'at) and a person affected by skin disease (מְּצֹרָע, metzora). In Numbers 12:10, after Miriam spoke against Moses, God's cloud removed from the Tent of Meeting and "Miriam was leprous (מְצֹרַעַת, m'tzora'at), as white as snow." In Deuteronomy 24:8–9, Moses warned the Israelites in the case of skin disease (צָּרַעַת, tzara'at) diligently to observe all that the priests would teach them, remembering what God did to Miriam. In 2 Kings 5:1–19, part of the haftarah for parashah Tazria, the prophet Elisha cures Naaman, the commander of the army of the king of Aram, who was a "leper" (מְּצֹרָע, metzora). In 2 Kings 7:3–20, part of the haftarah for parashah Metzora, the story is told of four "leprous men" (מְצֹרָעִים, m'tzora'im) at the gate during the Arameans' siege of Samaria. And in 2 Chronicles 26:19, after King Uzziah tried to burn incense in the Temple in Jerusalem, "leprosy (צָּרַעַת, tzara'at) broke forth on his forehead."

== In classical rabbinic interpretation ==
The parashah is discussed in these rabbinic sources from the era of the Mishnah and the Talmud:

=== Numbers chapter 8 ===
Rabbi Levi taught that God gave the section on the Menorah, Numbers 8:1–4, on the day that the Israelites set up the Tabernacle. Rabbi Rabbi Joḥanan said in the name of Rabbi Bana'ah that the Torah was transmitted in separate scrolls, as Psalm 40:8 says, "Then said I, 'Lo I am come, in the roll of the book it is written of me.'" Rabbi Shimon ben Lakish (Resh Lakish), however, said that the Torah was transmitted in its entirety, as Deuteronomy 31:26, "Take this book of the law." The Gemara reported that Rabbi Joḥanan interpreted Deuteronomy 31:26, "Take this book of the law," to refer to the time after the Torah had been joined from its several parts. And the Gemara suggested that Resh Lakish interpreted Psalm 40:8, "in a roll of the book written of me," to indicate that the whole Torah is called a "roll," as Zechariah 5:2 says, "And he said to me, 'What do you see?' And I answered, 'I see a flying roll.'" Or perhaps, the Gemara suggested, it is called "roll" for the reason given by Rabbi Levi, who said that God gave eight sections of the Torah, which Moses then wrote on separate rolls, on the day on which the Tabernacle was set up. They were: the section of the priests in Leviticus 21, the section of the Levites in Numbers 8:5–26 (as the Levites were required for the service of song on that day), the section of the unclean (who would be required to keep the Passover in the second month) in Numbers 9:1–14, the section of the sending of the unclean out of the camp (which also had to take place before the Tabernacle was set up) in Numbers 5:1–4, the section of Leviticus 16:1–34 (dealing with Yom Kippur, which Leviticus 16:1 states was transmitted immediately after the death of Aaron's two sons), the section dealing with the drinking of wine by priests in Leviticus 10:8–11, the section on the Menorah in Numbers 8:1–4, and the section of the red heifer in Numbers 19 (which came into force as soon as the Tabernacle was set up).

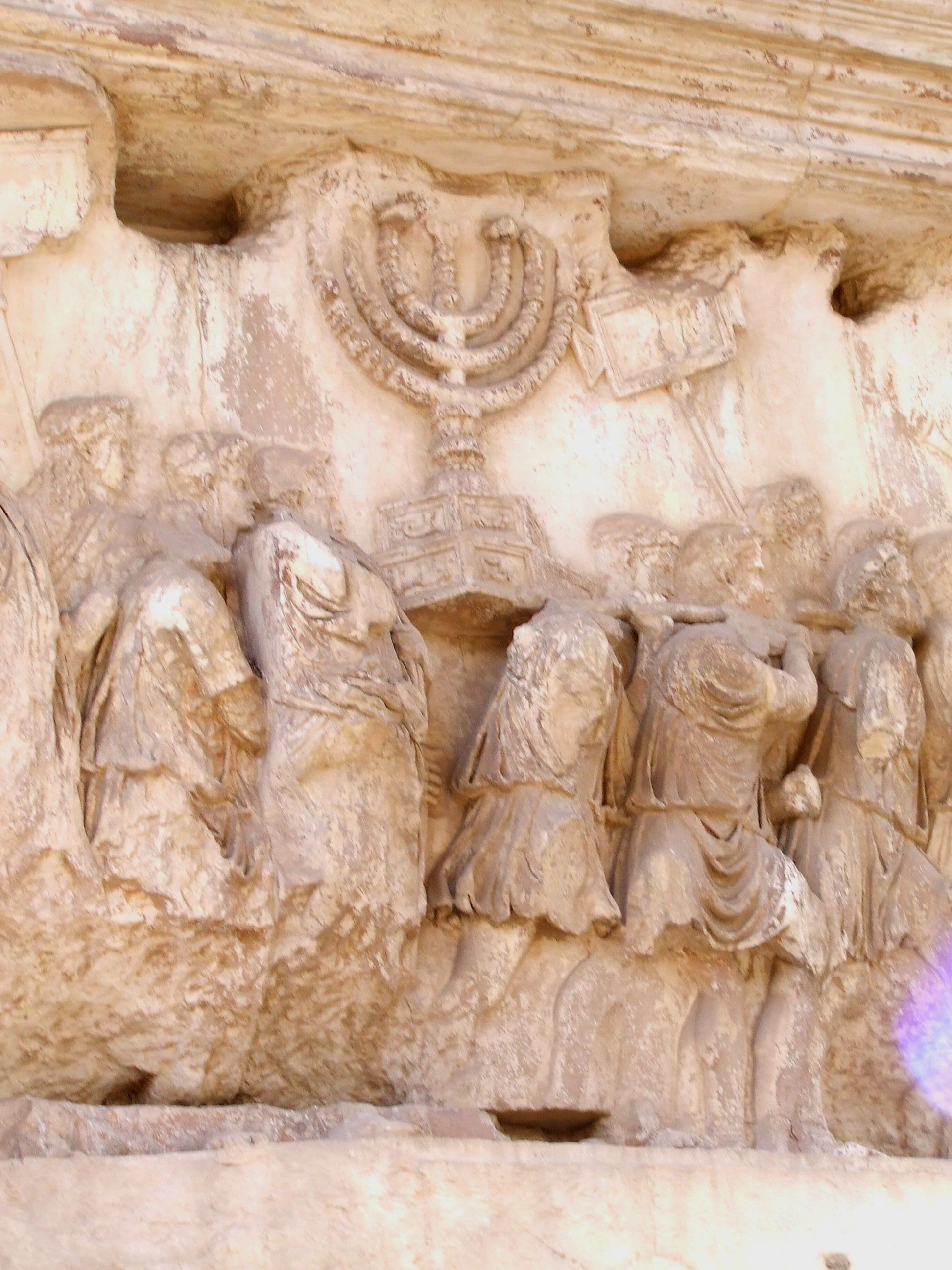
The Menorah portrayed on the Arch of Titus

A midrash taught that God instructed in Numbers 8:2, "the seven lamps shall give light toward the center of the Menorah," so that the evil inclination should not mislead one to believe that God needed the light. Rabbi Simeon reported that when he went to Rome, he saw the Menorah there, and all the lamps faced the middle lamp.

Rava also read Numbers 8:2 to say that the seven lamps gave light toward the center of the Menorah, and deduced from this that the middle in a series is favored. Rava taught that if the first Torah reader on a weekday reads four verses of the obligatory ten verses read on weekdays, that reader is to be commended; if the second (middle) reader reads four verses, that reader is to be commended; and if the third (last) reader reads four verses, that reader is to be commended. In support of the proposition that one should commend the middle reader if that reader reads four verses, Rava taught that Numbers 8:2 says that the lights were made to face the western lamp—the middle lamp of the Menorah—and the western lamp faced the Divine Presence; and Rabbi Joḥanan taught that this shows that the middle one is specially prized.

The Sifre taught that Numbers 8:3 reports, "And Aaron did so," to tell of Aaron's virtue, for he did exactly what Moses told him to do.

The Mishnah taught that there was a stone in front of the Menorah with three steps on which the priest stood to trim the lights. The priest left the oil jar on the second step. Reading Numbers 8:3 to say, "he set up the lamps," the Sifre taught that Aaron made these steps.

A baraita interpreted the expression "beaten work of gold" in Numbers 8:4 to require that if the craftsmen made the Menorah out of gold, then they had to beat it out of one single piece of gold. The Gemara then reasoned that Numbers 8:4 used the expression "beaten work" a second time to differentiate the requirements for crafting the Menorah from the requirements for crafting the trumpets in Numbers 10:2, which used the expression "beaten work" only once. The Gemara concluded that the verse required the craftsmen to beat the Menorah from a single piece of metal, but not so the trumpets.

A midrash deduced from the use of the word "this" in Numbers 8:4 that the work of the Menorah was one of four things that God had to show Moses with God's finger because Moses was puzzled by them. Similarly, Rabbi Ḥiyya bar Abba said in the name of Rabbi Joḥanan that the angel Gabriel girded himself with a worker's apron and showed Moses the work of the Menorah, for Numbers 8:4 says, "And this was the work of the Menorah." (The word "this" implying that something was held up to illustrate the instructions given.)

Rav Shalman deduced from Numbers 8:4 that the Menorah contained a total of nine flowers. According to Exodus 25:34, "And its flowers," there were two flowers on its main shaft. According to Exodus 25:33, "In one branch, a knob and a flower," there were six flowers on the six branches, for a total of eight. And Rav Shalman read Numbers 8:4, "It was a beaten work, from the base to the flower," to teach that there was a ninth flower near the base.

A midrash explained why the consecration of the Levites in Numbers 8:5–26 followed soon after the presentation of the twelve tribes' offerings in Numbers 7:10–88 The midrash noted that while the twelve tribes presented offerings at the dedication of the altar, the tribe of Levi did not offer anything. The Levites thus complained that they had been held back from bringing an offering for the dedication of the altar. The midrash compared this to the case of a king who held a feast and invited various craftsmen but did not invite a friend of whom the king was quite fond. The friend was distressed, thinking that perhaps the king harbored some grievance against him. But when the feast was over, the king called the friend and told him that while the king had made a feast for all the citizens of the province, the king would make a special feast with the friend alone, because of his friendship. So it was with God, who accepted the offerings of the twelve tribes in Numbers 7:5, and then turned to the tribe of Levi, addressing Aaron in Numbers 8:2 and directing the consecration of the Levites in Numbers 8:6–19.

A midrash taught that the words of Psalm 11:5, "The Lord tries the righteous; but the wicked and him who loves violence His soul hates," bear on God's instruction in Numbers 8:6, "Take the Levites." The midrash taught that the words of Psalm 11:5, "The Lord tries the righteous," imply that God never raises a person to high rank before first testing and trying that person. If the person stands the trial, God raises the person to high rank. The midrash found this to have been the case with Abraham, Isaac, Jacob, and Joseph, and so also with the tribe of Levi. The midrash taught that the Levites devoted their lives to the sanctification of God's Name. When the Israelites were in Egypt, the Israelites rejected the Torah and circumcision, as implied by Ezekiel's rebuke of them in Ezekiel 20:5, "Thus says the Lord God: 'In the day when I chose Israel, and lifted up my hand to the seed of the house of Jacob, and made Myself known to them in the land of Egypt'"; and afterwards, Ezekiel 20:8 says, "They rebelled against Me, and would not hearken to Me . . . then I said I would pour out My fury on them." So God brought darkness on the Egyptians for three days, and during that time God slew all the wicked Israelites, as Ezekiel 20:38 reports, "I will purge out from among you the rebels, and them that transgress against Me." The Levites, however, were all righteous and practiced the Torah; as Deuteronomy 33:9 says, "For they have observed Your word, and keep Your covenant." The midrash taught that "covenant" referred to circumcision, as Genesis 17:10 says, "This is My covenant . . . every male among you shall be circumcised." And the midrash taught that when the Israelites made the Golden Calf, the Levites did not participate, as Exodus 32:26 says: "Then Moses stood in the gate of the camp . . . and all the sons of Levi gathered themselves together to him." When Moses told them in Exodus 32:27, "Put every man his sword on his thigh," they did so and respected no persons. Moses accordingly blessed them in Deuteronomy 33:9, saying, "Who said of his father, and of his mother: 'I have not seen him.'" When God thus saw that the Levites were all righteous, and that they stood the test, as Deuteronomy 33:8 says, "Whom You did prove at Massah," God decided, as reported in Numbers 8:14, "The Levites shall be mine."

Reading the command of Numbers 8:7 that, when first appointed to office, the Levites had to cut their hair, the Gemara taught that there were three who were required to cut their hair, and whose hair cutting was a religious duty: nazirites (as stated in Numbers 6:18), those afflicted with skin disease (מְּצֹרָע, metzora, as stated in Leviticus 14:9), and the Levites. Citing the Mishnah, the Gemara taught that if any of them cut their hair without a razor, or left behind two hairs, their act was invalid.

Rabbi Jose the Galilean cited the use of "second" in Numbers 8:8 to rule that bulls brought for sacrifices had to be no more than two years old. But the Sages ruled that bulls could be as many as three years old, and Rabbi Meir ruled that even those that are four or five years old were valid, but old animals were not brought out of respect.

Reading Numbers 8:14, "And the Levites shall be Mine," a midrash taught that wherever Scripture says "to Me" or "Mine," it refers to something that shall never cease either in this world or in the World To Come.

The Mishnah deduced from Numbers 8:16 that before Moses set up the Tabernacle, the firstborn performed sacrifices, but after Moses set up the Tabernacle, priests performed the sacrifices.

Rabbi Judan considered God's five mentions of "Israel" in Numbers 8:19 to demonstrate how much God loves Israel.

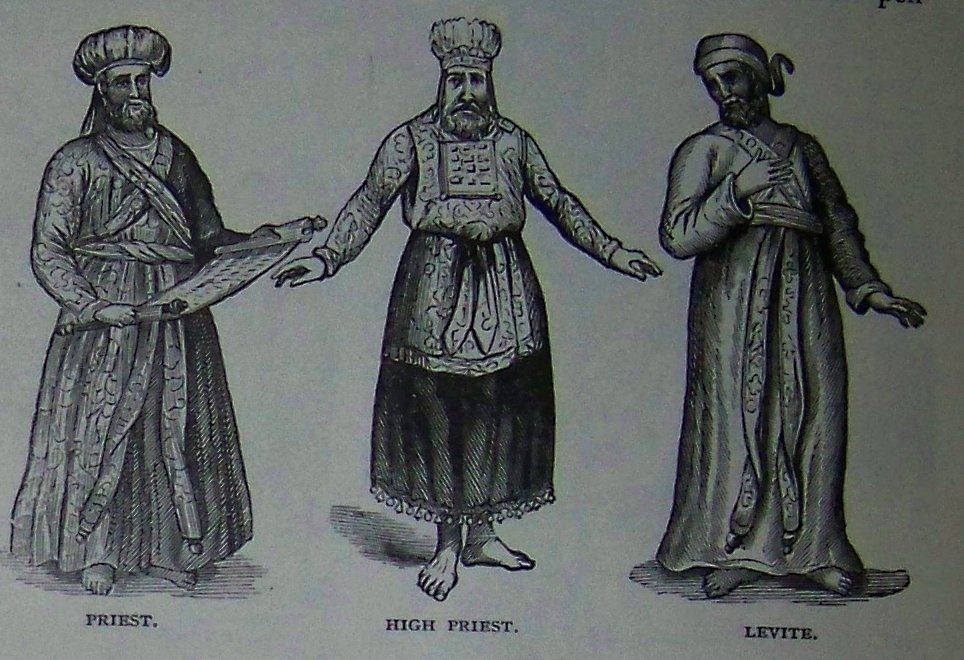
Priest, High Priest, and Levite (illustration from the 1890 Holman Bible)

The Jerusalem Talmud reported that Rabbi Tanḥuma in the name of Rabbi Lazar deduced from Numbers 8:19 that the Levites' singing made atonement for the Israelites. A baraita taught that the priests did the sacrificial service, the Levites sang on the platform while the priests offered the sacrifices, and the Israelites served as emissaries of the entire people when they attended the sacrifices. And another baraita reported that Rabbi Simeon ben Eleazar taught that priests, Levites, Israelites, and song were all essential for an offering. Rabbi Avin said in the name of Rabbi Eleazar that 2 Chronicles 29:28 provided support for this when it says, "And all the congregation prostrated themselves," these being the Israelites; "and the singers sang," these being the Levites; "and the trumpeters sounded," these being the priests; and the conclusion of the verse, "all this continued until the burnt-offering was finished," demonstrated that all were essential to complete the offering. Rabbi Tanḥuma said in the name of Rabbi Lazar that one may learn this from Numbers 8:19: "And I have given the Levites," these being the Levites; "to do the service of the children of Israel in the tent of meeting," these being the priests; "and to make atonement for the children of Israel," this being brought about by the singing; "through the children of Israel coming near to the sanctuary," these being the Israelites.

A midrash noted that Numbers 8:24 says, "from 25 years old and upward they shall go in to perform the service in the work of the tent of meeting," while Numbers 4:3, 23, 30, 35, 39, 43, and 47 say that Levites "30 years old and upward" did service in the tent of meeting. The midrash deduced that the difference teaches that all those five years, from the age of 25 to the age of 30, Levites served apprenticeships, and from that time onward they were allowed to draw near to do service. The midrash concluded that a Levite could not enter the Temple courtyard to do service unless he had served an apprenticeship of five years. And the midrash inferred from this that students who see no sign of success in their studies within a period of five years will never see any. Rabbi Jose said that students had to see success within three years, basing his position on the words "that they should be nourished three years" in Daniel 1:5.

The Mishnah taught that a disability that did not disqualify priests disqualified Levites, and a disability that did not disqualify Levites disqualified priests. The Gemara explained that our Rabbis taught that Leviticus 21:17 disqualified priests by reason of a bodily blemish, and not by reason of age; and Levites were disqualified by age, for they were qualified for service only from the age of 30 to 50, and not by bodily blemish. It follows, therefore, that the disability that does not disqualify priests disqualifies Levites, and the disability that does not disqualify Levites disqualifies priests. The Gemara taught that we know this from a baraita in which our Rabbis noted that Numbers 8:24 says: "This is that which pertains to the Levites." From Numbers 8:25, "And from the age of 50 years they shall return from the service of the work," we know that Levites were disqualified by age. One might have argued that they were disqualified by bodily blemish too; thus, if priests who were not disqualified by age were nevertheless disqualified by bodily blemish, Levites who were disqualified by age should surely have been disqualified by bodily blemish. Numbers 8:24 therefore says: "This is that which pertains to the Levites," to instruct that "this," that is, age, only disqualifies Levites, but nothing else disqualifies them. One might also have argued that priests were disqualified by age too; thus, if Levites who were not disqualified by bodily blemish were nevertheless disqualified by age, priests who were disqualified by bodily blemish should surely have been disqualified by age. Numbers 8:24 therefore says: "Which pertains to the Levites," and not "to the priests." One might further have supposed that the rule that Levites were disqualified by age obtained even at Shiloh and at the Temple at Jerusalem, where the Levites sang in the choir and guarded the doors of the Temple. Numbers 4:47 therefore says: "To do the work of service and the work of bearing burdens," to instruct that God ordained this rule disqualifying Levites by age only when the work was that of bearing burdens on the shoulder, the service of the Tabernacle in the wilderness, and not at the Temple at Jerusalem. Similarly, the Sifre taught that years invalidated in the case of Levites but not in the case of the priesthood. For prior to the entry into the Land of Israel, the Levites were valid from the age of 30 to the age of 50, while the priests were valid from puberty until the end of their lives. But once they came into the Land, the Levites were invalidated only by losing their voice. Elsewhere, the Sifre read Numbers 8:25–26, "and shall serve no more; but shall minister with their brethren in the tent of meeting, to keep the charge, but they shall do no manner of service," to teach that the Levite went back to the work of closing the doors and carrying out the tasks assigned to the sons of Gershom.

=== Numbers chapter 9 ===
The Gemara noted that the events beginning in Numbers 9:1, set "in the first month of the second year," occurred before the events at the beginning of the book of Numbers, which Numbers 1:1 reports began in "the second month, in the second year." Rav Menasia bar Tahlifa said in Rav's name that this proved that there is no chronological order in the Torah.

The Sifre concluded that Numbers 9:1–5 records the disgrace of the Israelites, as Numbers 9:1–5 reports the only Passover that the Israelites observed in the wilderness.

Rav Naḥman bar Isaac noted that both Numbers 1:1 and 9:1 begin, "And the Lord spoke to Moses in the wilderness of Sinai," and deduced that just as Numbers 1:1 happened (in the words of that verse) "on the first day of the second month," so too Numbers 9:1 happened at the beginning of the month. And as Numbers 9:1 addressed the Passover offering, which the Israelites were to bring on the 14th of the month, the Gemara concluded that one should expound the laws of a holiday two weeks before the festival.

Chapter 9 of Tractate Pesachim in the Mishnah and Babylonian Talmud and chapter 8 of Tractate Pesachim (Pisha) in the Tosefta interpreted the laws of the second Passover in Numbers 9:1–14. And Tractate Pesachim in the Mishnah, Tosefta, Jerusalem Talmud, and Babylonian Talmud interpreted the laws of Passover generally in Exodus 12:3–27, 43–49; 13:6–10; 23:15; 34:25; Leviticus 23:4–8; Numbers 9:1–14; 28:16–25; and Deuteronomy 16:1–8.

Interpreting Numbers 9:9–10, the Mishnah taught that anyone who was "unclean by reason [of contact] with a dead body or on a distant journey" and did not observe the first Passover was obliged to observe the second Passover. Furthermore, the Mishnah taught that if anyone unintentionally erred or was prevented from observing and thus did not observe the first Passover, then that person was obliged to observe the second Passover. The Mishnah asked why then Numbers 9:10 specified that people "unclean by reason of [contact with] a dead body or on a distant journey" observed the second Passover. The Mishnah answered that it was to teach that those "unclean by reason of [contact with] a dead body or on a distant journey" were exempt from being cut off from their kin, while those who deliberately failed to observe the Passover were liable to being cut off from their kin.

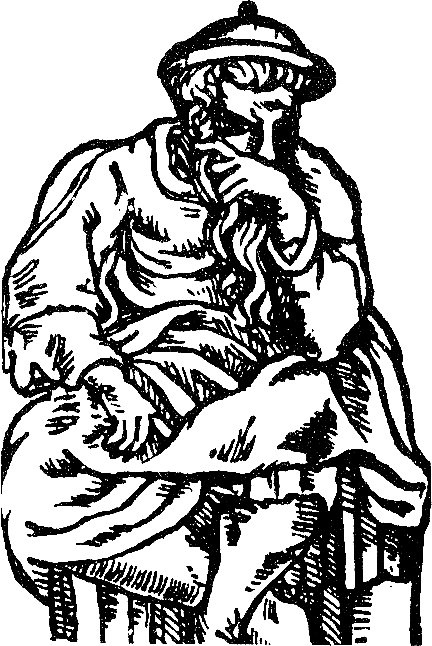
Rabbi Akiva (illustration from the 1568 Mantua Haggadah)

Interpreting Numbers 9:10, Rabbi Akiva taught that "a distant journey" was one from Modi'in and beyond, and the same distance in any direction from Jerusalem. But Rabbi Eliezer said that a journey was distant anytime one left the threshold of the Temple Court. And Rabbi Yose replied that it is for that reason that there is a dot over the letter hei (ה) in the word "distant" (רְחֹקָה, rechokah) in Numbers 9:10 in a Torah scroll, so as to teach that it was not really distant, but when one had departed from the threshold of the Temple Court, one was regarded as being on "a distant journey."

The Mishnah noted differences between the first Passover in Exodus 12:3–27, 43–49; 13:6–10; 23:15; 34:25; Leviticus 23:4–8; Numbers 9:1–14; 28:16–25; and Deuteronomy 16:1–8 and the second Passover in Numbers 9:9–13. The Mishnah taught that the prohibitions of Exodus 12:19 that "seven days shall there be no leaven found in your houses" and of Exodus 13:7 that "no leaven shall be seen in all your territory" applied to the first Passover; while at the second Passover, one could have both leavened and unleavened bread in one's house. And the Mishnah taught that for the first Passover, one was required to recite the Hallel (Psalms 113–118) when the Passover lamb was eaten; while the second Passover did not require the reciting of Hallel when the Passover lamb was eaten. But both the first and second Passovers required the reciting of Hallel when the Passover lambs were offered, and both Passover lambs were eaten roasted with unleavened bread and bitter herbs. And both the first and second Passovers took precedence over the Sabbath.

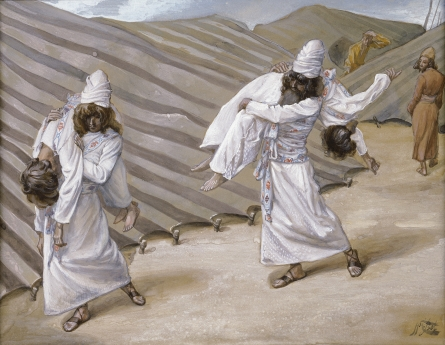
The Dead Bodies Carried Away (watercolor circa 1896–1902 by James Tissot)

Tractate Beitza in the Mishnah, Tosefta, Jerusalem Talmud, and Babylonian Talmud interpreted the laws common to all of the festivals in Exodus 12:3–27, 43–49; 13:6–10; 23:16; 34:18–23; Leviticus 16; 23:4–43; Numbers 9:1–14; 28:16–30:1; and Deuteronomy 16:1–17; 31:10–13.

Rabbi Jose the Galilean taught that the "certain men who were unclean by the dead body of a man, so that they could not keep the Passover on that day" in Numbers 9:6 were those who bore Joseph's coffin, as implied in Genesis 50:25 and Exodus 13:19. The Gemara cited their doing so to support the law that one who is engaged on one religious duty is free from any other. Rabbi Akiva said that they were Mishael and Elzaphan who were occupied with the remains of Nadab and Abihu (as reported in Leviticus 10:1–5). Rabbi Isaac argued, however, that if they were those who bore the coffin of Joseph or if they were Mishael and Elzaphan, they would have had time to cleanse themselves before Passover. Rather, Rabbi Isaac identified the men as some who were occupied with the obligation to bury an abandoned corpse (met mitzvah).

The Mishnah counted the sin of failing to observe the Passover enumerated in Numbers 9:13 as one of 36 sins punishable by the penalty of being cut off from the Israelite people.

Abaye deduced from the words "And on the day that the tabernacle was reared up" in Numbers 9:15 that the Israelites erected the Tabernacle only during the daytime, not at night, and thus that the building of the Temple could not take place at night.

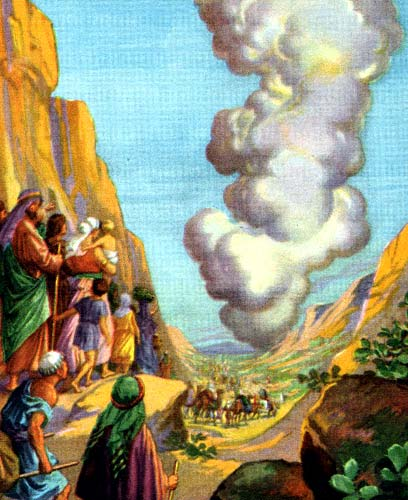
God Led Them by a Pillar of Cloud (illustration from Bible card published by the Providence Lithograph Company)

The Sifre asked how one could reconcile the report of Numbers 9:23 that "at the commandment of the Lord they journeyed" with the report of Numbers 10:35 that whenever they traveled, "Moses said: 'Rise up, O Lord.'" The Sifre compared the matter to the case of a king who told his servant to arrange things so that the king could hand over an inheritance to his son. Alternatively, the Sifre compared the matter to the case of a king who went along with his ally. As the king was setting out, he said that he would not set out until his ally came.

=== Numbers chapter 10 ===
It was taught in a baraita that Rabbi Josiah taught that the expression "make for yourself" (עֲשֵׂה לְךָ, aseih lecha) in Numbers 10:2 was a command for Moses to take from his own funds, in contrast to the expression "they shall take for you" (וְיִקְחוּ אֵלֶיךָ, v'yikhu eileicha) in Exodus 27:20, which was a command for Moses to take from communal funds.

Rabbi Yassa noted that in four places, Scripture uses the expression, "make for yourself (עֲשֵׂה לְךָ, oseh l'cha)." In three of those instances, God explained the material from which to make the thing, and in one God did not. Genesis 6:14 says, "Make for yourself an ark of gopher wood"; Numbers 10:2 says, "make for yourself two silver trumpets"; and Joshua 5:2 says, "make for yourself knives of flint." But Numbers 21:8 says merely, "make for yourself a fiery serpent" without further explanation. So Moses reasoned that a serpent is essentially a snake, and made the snake of copper, because in Hebrew, the word for copper (נְחֹשֶׁת, nechoshet) sounds like the word for snake (נְחַשׁ, nechash).

When Samuel had a bad dream, he used to quote Zechariah 10:2, "The dreams speak falsely." When he had a good dream, he used to question whether dreams speak falsely, seeing as in Numbers 10:2, God says, "I speak with him in a dream?" Rava pointed out the potential contradiction between Numbers 10:2 and Zechariah 10:2. The Gemara resolved the contradiction, teaching that Numbers 10:2, "I speak with him in a dream?" refers to dreams that come through an angel, whereas Zechariah 10:2, "The dreams speak falsely," refers to dreams that come through a demon. The Gemara taught that a dream is a sixtieth part of prophecy. Rabbi Hanan taught that even if the Master of Dreams (an angel, in a dream that truly foretells the future) tells a person that on the next day the person will die, the person should not desist from prayer, for as Ecclesiastes 5:6 says, "For in the multitude of dreams are vanities and also many words, but fear God." (Although a dream may seem reliably to predict the future, it will not necessarily come true; one must place one's trust in God.) Rabbi Samuel bar Naḥmani said in the name of Rabbi Jonathan that a person is shown in a dream only what is suggested by the person's own thoughts (while awake), as Daniel 2:29 says, "As for you, Oh King, your thoughts came into your mind on your bed," and Daniel 2:30 says, "That you may know the thoughts of the heart."

Reading Numbers 10:9–10, Rabbi Akiva questioned whether the trumpets caused God's remembrance. Rather, Rabbi Akiva suggested, the trumpets turned the Israelite's hearts toward God.

The Gemara taught that the Israelites would sound the trumpets for various calamities, including drought, pestilence, blight, mildew, locusts, caterpillars, dangerous beasts, and war.

Rabbi Ḥama bar Ḥaninah and Rabbi Josiah disagreed about what configuration the Israelites traveled in when they traveled in the Wilderness. Based on Numbers 2:17, "as they encamp, so shall they set forward," one said that they traveled in the shape of a box. Based on Numbers 10:25, "the camp of the children of Dan, which was the rearward of all the camps," the other said that they traveled in the shape of a beam—in a row. Refuting the other's argument, the one who said that they traveled in the shape of a beam read Numbers 2:17, "as they encamp, so shall they set forward," to teach that just as the configuration of their camp was according to God's Word, so the configuration of their journey was by God's Word. While the one who said that they traveled in the shape of a box read Numbers 10:25, "the camp of the children of Dan, which was the rearward of all the camps," to teach that Dan was more populous than the other camps, and would thus travel in the rear, and if anyone would lose any item, the camp of Dan would return it. The Sifre read the words of Numbers 10:29, "the father-in-law of Moses," as the highest possible tribute to Hobab (elsewhere called Jethro). And the Sifre inferred from the verse that God commanded Israel to show kindness to converts and to deport themselves to converts with humility.

The Tosefta taught that God gave the Israelites seven clouds in the wilderness—one on their right, one on their left, one before them, one, behind them, one over their heads, and one among them. And the seventh pillar of cloud went ahead of them and would kill snakes and scorpions; burn off thorns, brambles, and prickly bushes; and level down high places and raise up low places, making for them a straight path, as Numbers 10:33 says, "the ark of the covenant of the Lord went before them." And the Tosefta read Numbers 10:34, "And the cloud of the Lord was over them by day," to teach that the Israelites made use of the cloud all 40 years that they were in the wilderness.

The Sifre deduced from the words "And the cloud of the Lord was over them by day" in Numbers 10:34 that God's cloud hovered over the people with disabilities and illnesses—including those afflicted with emissions and skins diseases that removed them from the camp proper—protecting those with special needs.

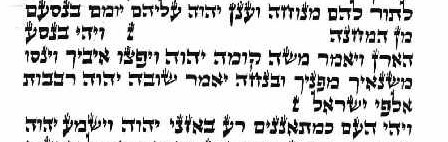
Numbers 10:33–11:1 in a Torah scroll

The Sages taught that inverted nuns ( ] ) bracket the verses Numbers 10:35–36, about how the Ark would move, to teach that the verses are not in their proper place. But Rabbi said that the nuns do not appear there on that account, but because Numbers 10:35–36 constitute a separate book. It thus follows according to Rabbi that there are seven books of the Torah, and this accords with the interpretation that Rabbi Samuel bar Naḥmani made in the name of Rabbi Jonathan of Proverbs 9:1, when it says, "She [Wisdom] has hewn out her seven pillars," referring to seven Books of the Law. Rabban Simeon ben Gamaliel, however, taught that Numbers 10:35–36 were written where they are to provide a break between two accounts of Israel's transgressions. The first account appears in Numbers 10:33, "they set forward from the mount of the Lord three days' journey," which Rabbi Ḥama ben Ḥanina said meant that the Israelites turned away from following the Lord within three short days, and the second account appears in Numbers 11:1, which reports the Israelites' murmurings. Rav Ashi taught that Numbers 10:35–36 more properly belong in Numbers 2, which reports how the Tabernacle would move.

Rabbi Tarfon used the expression "ten thousands" in Numbers 10:36 to interpret the path of God's revelation. Rabbi Tarfon taught that God came from Mount Sinai (or others say Mount Seir) and was revealed to the children of Esau, as Deuteronomy 33:2 says, "The Lord came from Sinai, and rose from Seir to them," and "Seir" means the children of Esau, as Genesis 36:8 says, "And Esau dwelt in Mount Seir." God asked them whether they would accept the Torah, and they asked what was written in it. God answered that it included (in Exodus 20:13 and Deuteronomy 5:17), "You shall do no murder." The children of Esau replied that they were unable to abandon the blessing with which Isaac blessed Esau in Genesis 27:40, "By your sword shall you live." From there, God turned and was revealed to the children of Ishmael, as Deuteronomy 33:2 says, "He shined forth from Mount Paran," and "Paran" means the children of Ishmael, as Genesis 21:21 says of Ishmael, "And he dwelt in the wilderness of Paran." God asked them whether they would accept the Torah, and they asked what was written in it. God answered that it included (in Exodus 20:13 and Deuteronomy 5:17), "You shall not steal." The children of Ishmael replied that they were unable to abandon their fathers' custom, as Joseph said in Genesis 40:15 (referring to the Ishmaelites' transaction reported in Genesis 37:28), "For indeed I was stolen away out of the land of the Hebrews." From there, God sent messengers to all the nations of the world asking them whether they would accept the Torah, and they asked what was written in it. God answered that it included (in Exodus 20:3 and Deuteronomy 5:7), "You shall have no other gods before me." They replied that they had no delight in the Torah, therefore let God give it to God's people, as Psalm 29:11 says, "The Lord will give strength [identified with the Torah] to His people; the Lord will bless His people with peace." From there, God returned and was revealed to the children of Israel, as Deuteronomy 33:2 says, "And he came from the ten thousands of holy ones," and the expression "ten thousands" means the children of Israel, as Numbers 10:36 says, "And when it rested, he said, ‘Return, O Lord, to the ten thousands of the thousands of Israel.’" With God were thousands of chariots and 20,000 angels, and God’s right hand held the Torah, as Deuteronomy 33:2 says, "At his right hand was a fiery law to them."

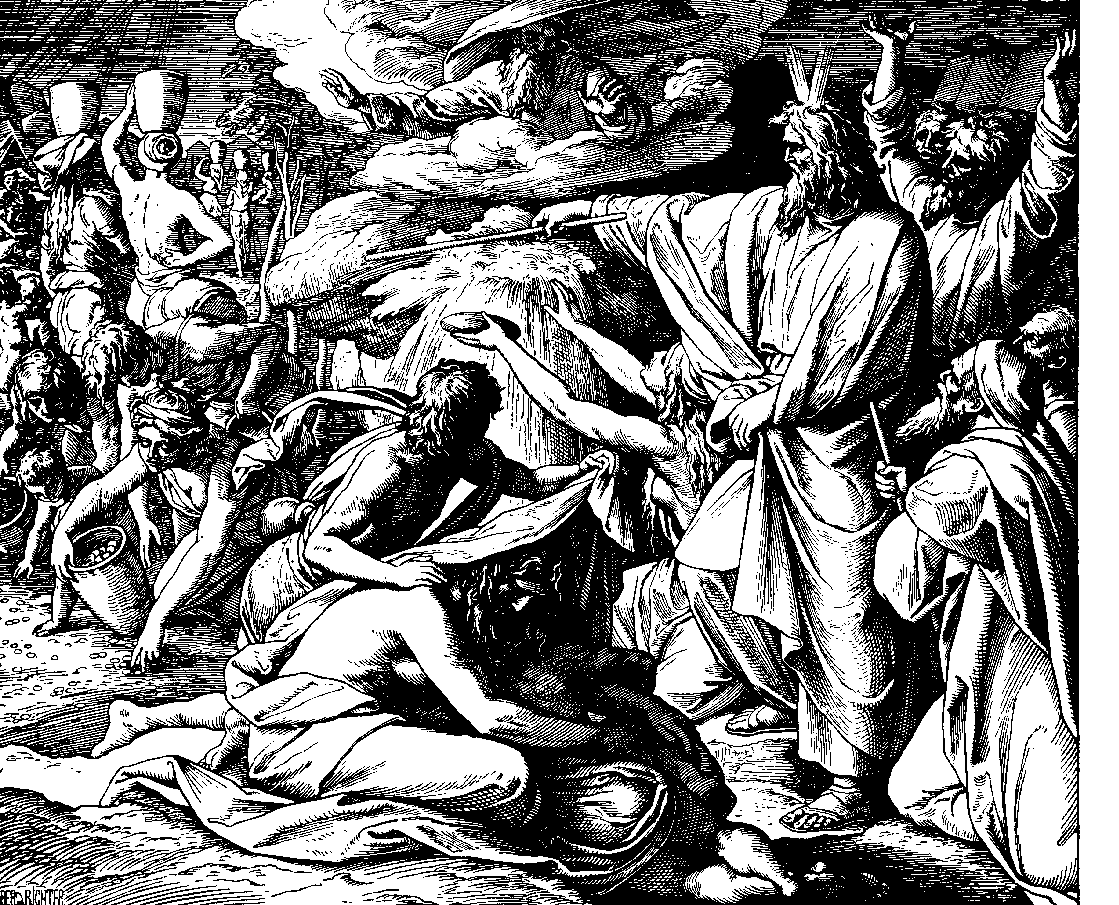
Gathering Manna (woodcut by Julius Schnorr von Carolsfeld from the 1860 Bible in Pictures)

=== Numbers chapter 11 ===
Rav and Samuel debated how to interpret the report of Numbers 11:5 that the Israelites complained: "We remember the fish, which we ate in Egypt for free." One read "fish" literally, while the other read "fish" to mean the illicit intercourse that they were "free" to have when they were in Egypt, before the commandments of Sinai. Rabbi Ammi and Rabbi Assi disputed the meaning of the report of Numbers 11:5 that the Israelites remembered the cucumbers, melons, leeks, onions, and garlic of Egypt. One said that manna had the taste of every kind of food except these five; while the other said that manna had both the taste and the substance of all foods except these, for which manna had only the taste without the substance.

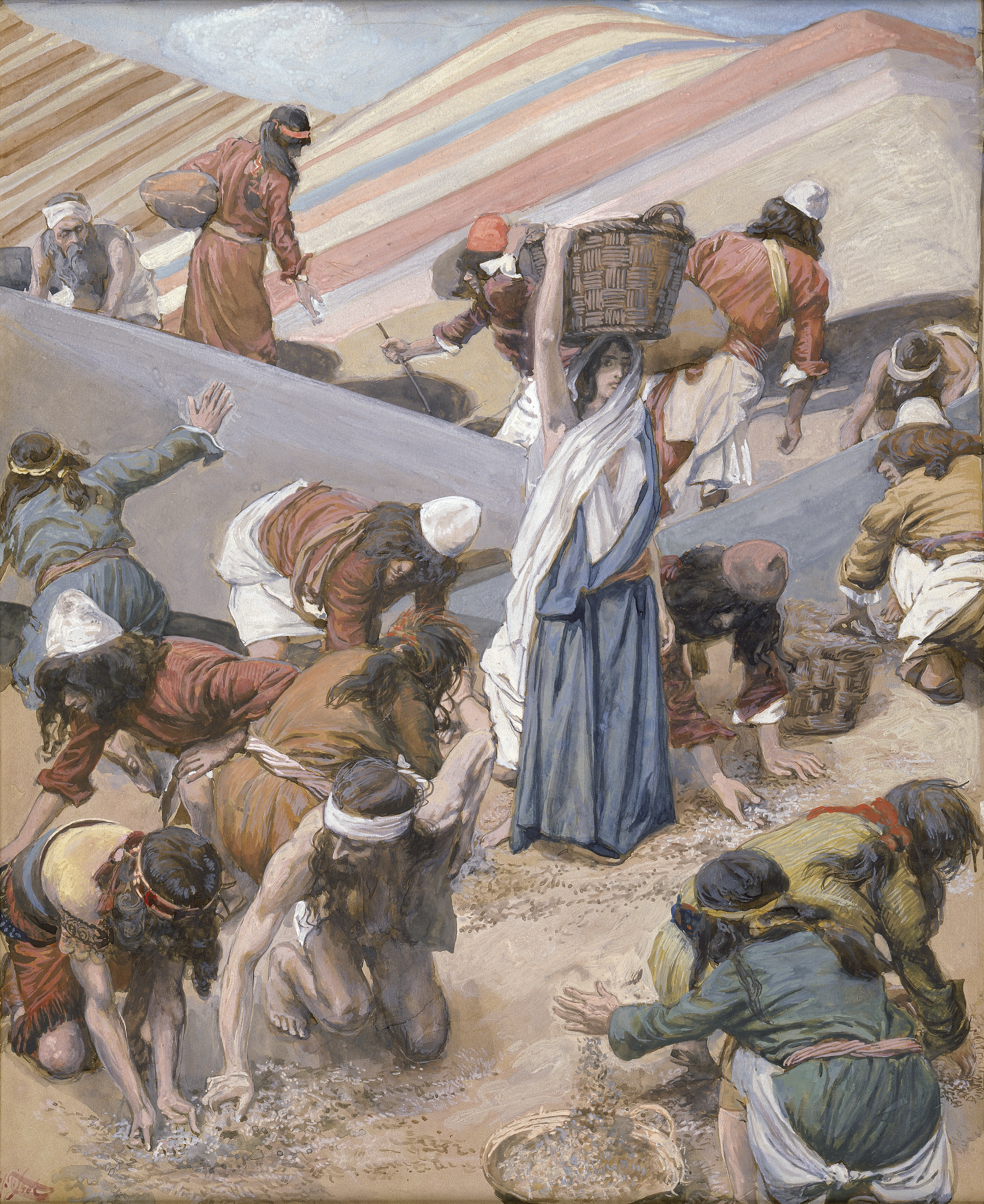
The Gathering of the Manna (gouache on board c. 1896–1902 by James Tissot)

The Gemara asked how one could reconcile Numbers 11:9, which reported that manna fell "on the camp," with Numbers 11:8, which reported that "people went about and gathered it," implying that they had to leave the camp to get it. The Gemara concluded that the manna fell at different places for different classes of people: For the righteous, it fell in front of their homes; for average folk, it fell just outside the camp, and they went out and gathered; and for the wicked, it fell at some distance, and they had to go about to gather it.

The Gemara asked how one could reconcile Exodus 16:4, which reported that manna fell as "bread from heaven"; with Numbers 11:8, which reported that people "made cakes of it," implying that it required baking; with Numbers 11:8, which reported that people "ground it in mills," implying that it required grinding. The Gemara concluded that the manna fell in different forms for different classes of people: For the righteous, it fell as bread; for average folk, it fell as cakes that required baking; and for the wicked, it fell as kernels that required grinding.

Rav Judah said in the name of Rav (or others say Rabbi Ḥama ben Ḥanina) that the words "ground it in mortars" in Numbers 11:8 taught that with the manna came down women's cosmetics, which were also ground in mortars. Rabbi Ḥama interpreted the words "seethed it in pots" in Numbers 11:8 to teach that with the manna came down the ingredients or seasonings for a cooked dish. Rabbi Abbahu interpreted the words "the taste of it was as the taste of a cake (leshad) baked with oil" in Numbers 11:8 to teach that just as infants find many flavors in the milk of their mother's breast (shad), so the Israelites found many tastes in the manna. The Gemara asked how one could reconcile Numbers 11:8, which reported that "the taste of it was as the taste of a cake baked with oil," with Exodus 16:31, which reported that "the taste of it was like wafers made with honey." Rabbi Jose ben Ḥanina said that the manna tasted differently for different classes of people: It tasted like honey for infants, bread for youths, and oil for the aged.

Rabbi Eleazar, on the authority of Rabbi Simlai, noted that Deuteronomy 1:16 says, "And I charged your judges at that time," while Deuteronomy 1:18 similarly says, "I charged you [the Israelites] at that time." Rabbi Eleazar deduced that Deuteronomy 1:18 meant to warn the Congregation to revere their judges, and Deuteronomy 1:16 meant to warn the judges to be patient with the Congregation. Rabbi Hanan (or some say Rabbi Shabatai) said that this meant that judges must be as patient as Moses, who Numbers 11:12 reports acted "as the nursing father carries the sucking child."

A midrash asked why in Numbers 11:16, God directed Moses to gather 70 elders of Israel, when Exodus 24:9 reported that there already were 70 elders of Israel. The midrash deduced that when in Numbers 11:1, the people murmured, speaking evil, and God sent fire to devour part of the camp, all those earlier 70 elders had been burned up. The midrash continued that the earlier 70 elders were consumed like Nadab and Abihu, because they too acted frivolously when (as reported in Exodus 24:11) they beheld God and inappropriately ate and drank. The midrash taught that Nadab, Abihu, and the 70 elders deserved to die then, but because God so loved giving the Torah, God did not wish to disturb that time.

A midrash read Numbers 11:16, "Gather to Me 70 men," to indicate God's assessment of the elder's worthiness. The midrash compared God's words in Numbers 11:16 to the case of a rich man who had a vineyard. Whenever he saw that the wine was good, he would direct his men to bring the wine into his house, but when he saw that the wine had turned to vinegar, he would tell his men to take the wine into their houses. Similarly, when God saw the elders and how worthy they were, God called them God's own, as God says in Numbers 11:16, "Gather to Me 70 men," but when God saw the spies and how they would later sin in slandering the land, God ascribed them to Moses, saying in Numbers 13:2, "Send you men."

Rabbi Ḥama ben Ḥanina taught that our ancestors were never without a scholars' council. Abraham was an elder and a member of the scholars' council, as Genesis 24:1 says, "And Abraham was an elder (זָקֵן, zaken) well stricken in age." Eliezer, Abraham's servant, was an elder and a member of the scholars' council, as Genesis 24:2 says, "And Abraham said to his servant, the elder of his house, who ruled over all he had," which Rabbi Eleazar explained to mean that he ruled over—and thus knew and had control of—the Torah of his master. Isaac was an elder and a member of the scholars' council, as Genesis 27:1 says: "And it came to pass when Isaac was an elder (זָקֵן, zaken)." Jacob was an elder and a member of the scholars' council, as Genesis 48:10 says, "Now the eyes of Israel were dim with age (זֹּקֶן, zoken)." In Egypt they had the scholars' council, as Exodus 3:16 says, "Go and gather the elders of Israel together." And in the Wilderness, they had the scholars' council, as in Numbers 11:16, God directed Moses to "Gather . . . 70 men of the elders of Israel."

The Mishnah deduced from Numbers 11:16 that the Great Sanhedrin consisted of 71 members, because God instructed Moses to gather 70 elders of Israel, and Moses at their head made 71. Rabbi Judah said that it consisted only of 70.

Rav Aha bar Jacob argued for an interpretation of the words "that they may stand there with you" with regard to the 70 judges in Numbers 11:16. Rav Aha bar Jacob argued that the words "with you" implied that the judges needed to be "like you"—that is, like Moses—in unblemished genealogical background. But the Gemara did not accept that argument.

In Proverbs 8:15, Wisdom (which the Rabbis equated with the Torah) says, "By me kings reign, and princes decree justice." A midrash taught that Proverbs 8:15 thus reports what happened to Joshua, for as Numbers 27:18 reports, it was not the sons of Moses who succeeded their father, but Joshua. And the midrash taught that Proverbs 27:18, "And he who waits on his master shall be honored," also alludes to Joshua, for Joshua ministered to Moses day and night, as reported by Exodus 33:11, which says, "Joshua departed not out of the Tent," and Numbers 11:28, which says, "Joshua . . . said: ‘My lord Moses, shut them in.’" Consequently, God honored Joshua by saying of Joshua in Numbers 27:21: "He shall stand before Eleazar the priest, who shall inquire for him by the judgment of the Urim." And because Joshua served his master Moses, Joshua attained the privilege of receiving the Holy Spirit, as Joshua 1:1 reports, "Now it came to pass after the death of Moses . . . that the Lord spoke to Joshua, the minister of Moses." The midrash taught that there was no need for Joshua 1:1 to state, "the minister of Moses," so the purpose of the statement "the minister of Moses" was to explain that Joshua was awarded the privilege of prophecy because he was the minister of Moses.

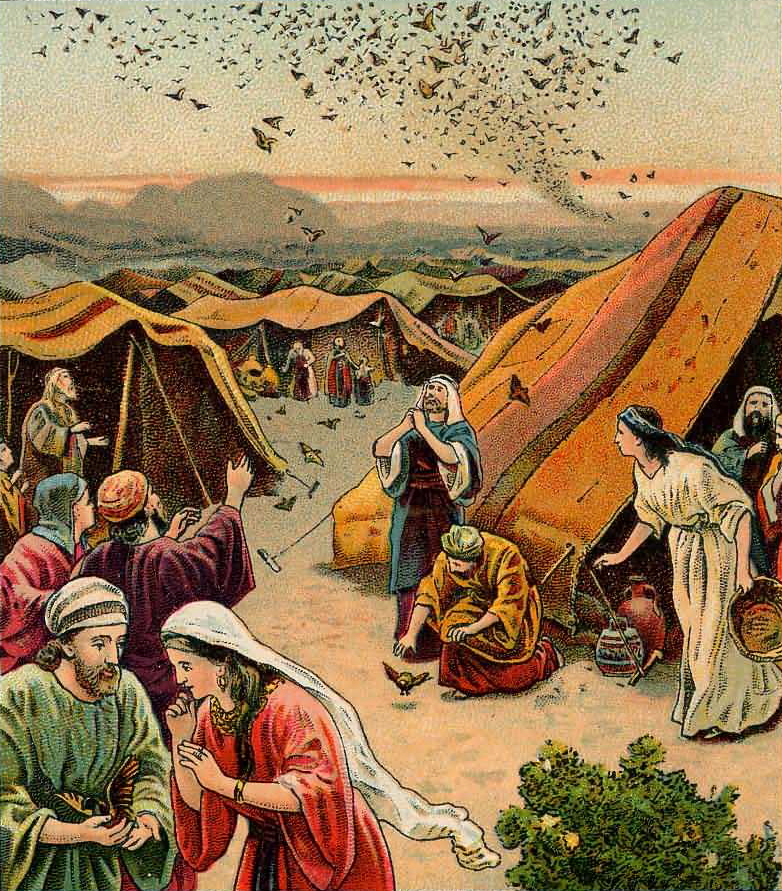
The Giving of the Manna and Quail (Bible card published 1901 by the Providence Lithograph Company)

The Gemara asked how one could reconcile Numbers 11:20, which reported God's promise that the Israelites would eat meat "a whole month," with Numbers 11:33, which reported that "while the flesh was still between their teeth, before it was chewed, . . . the Lord smote the people." The Gemara concluded that God's punishment came at different speeds for different classes of people: Average people died immediately; while the wicked suffered over a month before they died.

Reading God's criticism of Moses in Numbers 20:12, "Because you did not believe in me," a midrash asked whether Moses had not previously said worse when in Numbers 11:22, he showed a greater lack of faith and questioned God's powers asking: "If flocks and herds be slain for them, will they suffice them? Or if all the fish of the sea be gathered together for them, will they suffice them?" The midrash explained by relating the case of a king who had a friend who displayed arrogance towards the king privately, using harsh words. The king did not, however, lose his temper with his friend. Later, the friend displayed his arrogance in the presence of the king's legions, and the king sentenced his friend to death. So also God told Moses that the first offense that Moses committed (in Numbers 11:22) was a private matter between Moses and God. But now that Moses had committed a second offense against God in public, it was impossible for God to overlook it, and God had to react, as Numbers 20:12 reports, "To sanctify Me in the eyes of the children of Israel."

The Gemara explained how Moses selected the members of the Sanhedrin in Numbers 11:24. The Rabbis taught in a baraita that when (in Numbers 11:16) God told Moses to gather 70 elders of Israel, Moses worried that if he chose six from each of the 12 tribes, there would be 72 elders, two more than God requested. If he chose five elders from each tribe, there would be 60 elders, ten short of the number God requested. If Moses chose six out of some tribes and five out of others, he would sow jealousy among the tribes. To solve this problem, Moses selected six prospective elders out of each tribe. Then he brought 72 lots, on 70 of which he wrote the word "elder" and two of which he left blank. He then mixed up all the lots, put them in an urn, and asked the 72 prospective elders to draw lots. To each prospective elder who drew a lot marked "elder," Moses said that Heaven had consecrated him. To those two prospective elders who drew a blank, Moses said that Heaven had rejected them, what could Moses do? According to this baraita, some say the report in Numbers 11:26 that Eldad and Medad remained in the camp meant that their lots—marked "elder"—remained in the urn, as Eldad and Medad were afraid to draw their lots. Other prospective elders drew the two blank lots, so Eldad and Medad were thus selected elders.

Rabbi Simeon expounded a different view on the report in Numbers 11:26 that Eldad and Medad remained in the camp. When God ordered Moses in Numbers 11:16 to gather 70 of the elders of Israel, Eldad and Medad protested that they were not worthy of that dignity. In reward for their humility, God added yet more greatness to their greatness; so while the other elders' prophesying ceased, Eldad's and Medad's prophesying continued. Rabbi Simeon taught that Eldad and Medad prophesied that Moses would die and Joshua would bring Israel into the Land of Israel. Abba Ḥanin taught in the name of Rabbi Eliezer that Eldad and Medad prophesied about the quails in Numbers 11, calling on the quail to arise. Rav Naḥman read Ezekiel 38:17 to teach that they prophesied concerning Gog and Magog. The Gemara found support for Rabbi Simeon's assertion that while the other elders' prophesying ceased, Eldad's and Medad's prophesying continued in the use by Numbers 11:25 of the past tense, "and they prophesied," to describe the other elders, whereas Numbers 11:27 uses the present tense regarding Eldad and Medad. The Gemara taught that if Eldad and Medad prophesied that Moses would die, then that explains why Joshua in Numbers 11:28 requested Moses to forbid them. The Gemara reasoned that if Eldad and Medad prophesied about the quail or Gog and Magog, then Joshua asked Moses to forbid them because their behavior did not appear seemly, like a student who issues legal rulings in the presence of his teacher. The Gemara further reasoned that according to those who said that Eldad and Medad prophesied about the quail or Gog and Magog, Moses' response in Numbers 11:28, "Would that all the Lord's people were prophets," made sense. But if Eldad and Medad prophesied that Moses would die, the Gemara wondered why Moses expressed pleasure with that in Numbers 11:28. The Gemara explained that Moses must not have heard their entire prophecy. And the Gemara interpreted Joshua's request in Numbers 11:28 for Moses to "forbid them" to mean that Moses should give Eldad and Medad public burdens that would cause them to cease their prophesying.

A midrash taught that Eldad and Medad thought that they were not worthy to be among the 70 elders, and in reward for their humility, God gave them several rewards more than the elders: (1) Whereas the elders prophesied only for the next day, Eldad and Medad prophesied what would happen for 40 years. (2) Whereas the elders did not enter the Land, Eldad and Medad did. (3) Whereas the Torah does not tell the names of the elders, it does tell the names of Eldad and Medad. (4) Whereas the prophecy of the elders ended, as it came from Moses, the prophecy of Eldad and Medad came from God.

A midrash read "the young man" (הַנַּעַר, hana’ar) in Numbers 11:27 to be Gershom the son of Moses, as the text says "the young man," implying that he was known, and no young man would have been better known than the firstborn son of Moses.

=== Numbers chapter 12 ===
The Sifre explained about what Miriam and Aaron spoke to Moses in Numbers 12:1. Miriam found out that Moses had ceased to have marital relations with his wife Zipporah when Miriam observed that Zipporah was not making herself up with women's ornaments. Miriam asked Zipporah why she was not making herself up like other women, and Zipporah answered that Moses did not pay any attention to such things. Thus, Miriam realized that Moses has ceased having marital relations with Zipporah and told Aaron, and both Miriam and Aaron spoke against Moses. Rabbi Nathan taught that Miriam was standing alongside Zipporah when (as recounted in Numbers 11:27) the youth ran and told Moses that Eldad and Medad were prophesying in the camp. When Zipporah heard the report, she lamented for the wives of Eldad and Medad because the men had become prophets, and the wives would thus lose their husbands' attention. On that basis, Miriam realized the situation and told Aaron, and both spoke against Moses.

The Gemara cited Numbers 12:3 for the proposition that prophets had to be humble. In Deuteronomy 18:15, Moses foretold that "A prophet will the Lord your God raise up for you . . . like me," and Rabbi Joḥanan thus taught that prophets would have to be, like Moses, strong, wealthy, wise, and humble. Strong, for Exodus 40:19 says of Moses, "he spread the tent over the tabernacle," and a Master taught that Moses himself spread it, and Exodus 26:16 reports, "Ten cubits shall be the length of a board." Similarly, the strength of Moses can be derived from Deuteronomy 9:17, in which Moses reports, "And I took the two tablets, and cast them out of my two hands, and broke them," and it was taught that the tablets were six handbreadths in length, six in breadth, and three in thickness. Wealthy, as Exodus 34:1 reports God's instruction to Moses, "Carve yourself two tablets of stone," and the Rabbis interpreted the verse to teach that the chips would belong to Moses. Wise, for Rav and Samuel both said that 50 gates of understanding were created in the world, and all but one were given to Moses, for Psalm 8:6 said of Moses, "You have made him a little lower than God." Humble, for Numbers 12:3 reports, "Now the man Moses was very humble."

A midrash asked why Moses had to account to the Israelites, seeing as God trusted Moses so implicitly that God said in Numbers 12:7, "My servant Moses is not so; he is trusted in all My house." The midrash explained that Moses overheard certain Israelites scoffing behind his back, for Exodus 33:8 says, "And they (the Israelites) looked after Moses." The midrash asked what the people would say about Moses. Rabbi Joḥanan taught that the people blessed his mother, for she never saw him, as he was always speaking with God and always wholly given over to his service. But Rabbi Hama said that they used to remark how fat and prosperous Moses looked. When Moses heard this, he vowed to give an account of everything. And this is why Exodus 38:21 says, "These are the accounts of the Tabernacle." Reading Exodus 38:21, "as they were rendered according to the commandment of Moses," the midrash taught that the Israelites did everything that they did by the command of Moses. And reading the continuation of Exodus 38:21, "through the service of the Levites, by the hand of Ithamar, the son of Aaron the priest," the midrash taught that everything that Moses made was done through others. Even though everything was done with witnesses, as soon as the construction of the Tabernacle was completed, Moses wasted no time to promise the people the complete details of all the expenditures involved. Moses then began to expound in Exodus 38:21, "These are the accounts of the Tabernacle," saying how much he had expended on the Tabernacle. While engaged in this calculation, Moses completely forgot about 1,775 shekalim of silver that he had used for hooks for the pillars, and he became uneasy thinking to himself that the Israelites would find grounds to say that Moses took them for himself. So God opened the eyes of Moses to realize that the silver had been converted into hooks for the pillars. When the Israelites saw that the account now completely tallied, they were completely satisfied with the integrity of the work on the Tabernacle. And thus Exodus 38:21 says, "These are the accounts of the Tabernacle," to report that the accounts balanced.

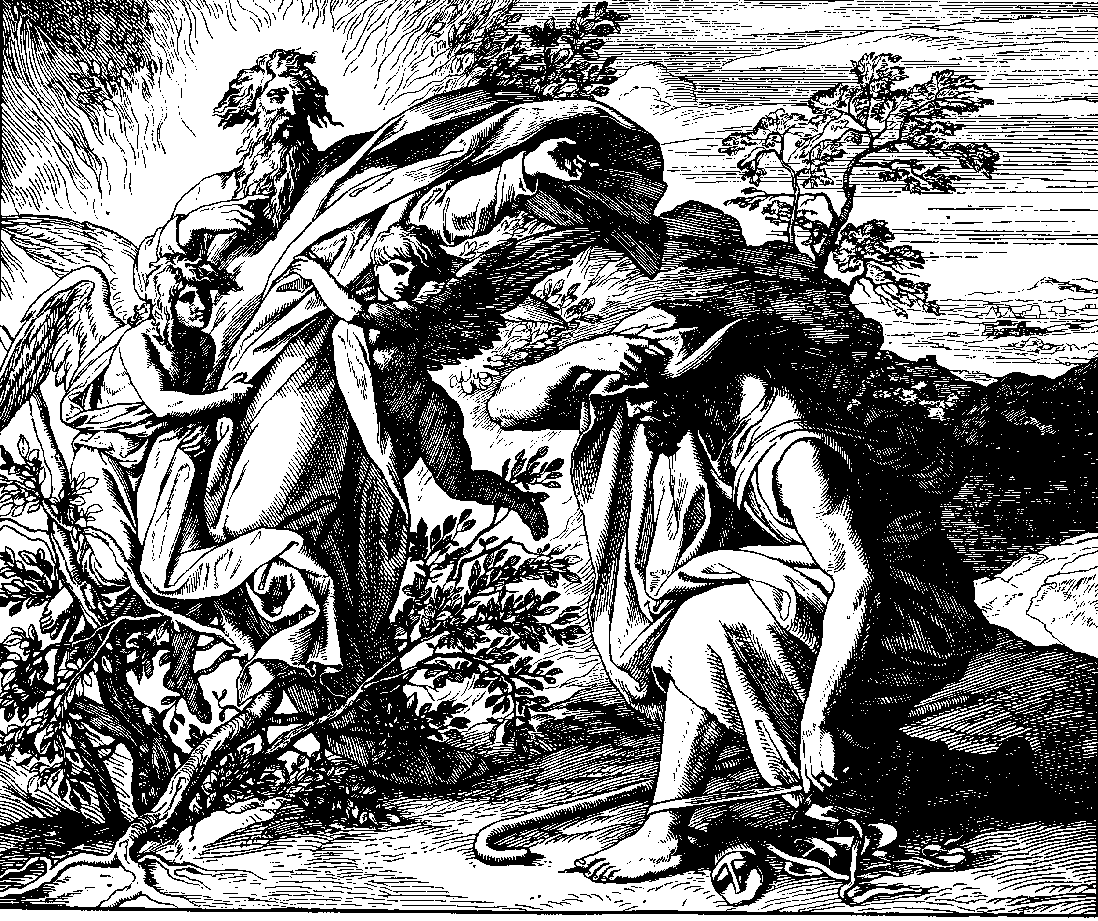
Moses at the Burning Bush (woodcut by Julius Schnorr von Carolsfeld from the 1860 Bible in Pictures)

Rabbi Samuel bar Naḥmani said in the name of Rabbi Jonathan that Moses beheld the likeness of God in Numbers 12:8 in compensation for a pious thing that Moses did. A baraita taught in the name of Rabbi Joshua ben Korḥah that God told Moses that when God wanted to be seen at the burning bush, Moses did not want to see God's face; Moses hid his face in Exodus 3:6, for he was afraid to look on God. And then in Exodus 33:18, when Moses wanted to see God, God did not want to be seen; in Exodus 33:20, God said, "You cannot see My face." But Rabbi Samuel bar Naḥmani said in the name of Rabbi Jonathan that in compensation for three pious acts that Moses did at the burning bush, he was privileged to obtain three rewards. In reward for hiding his face in Exodus 3:6, his face shone in Exodus 34:29. In reward for his fear of God in Exodus 3:6, the Israelites were afraid to come near him in Exodus 34:30. In reward for his reticence "to look on God," he beheld the likeness of God in Numbers 12:8.

The Gemara reported that some taught that in Numbers 12:8, God approved of the decision of Moses to abstain from marital relations so as to remain pure for his communication with God. A baraita taught that Moses did three things of his own understanding, and God approved: (1) He added one day of abstinence of his own understanding; (2) he separated himself from his wife (entirely, after the Revelation); and (3) he broke the Tables (on which God had written the Ten Commandments). The Gemara explained that to reach his decision to separate himself from his wife, Moses applied an a fortiori (kal va-chomer) argument to himself. Moses noted that even though the Shechinah spoke with the Israelites on only one definite, appointed time (at Mount Sinai), God nonetheless instructed in Exodus 19:10, "Be ready against the third day: come not near a woman." Moses reasoned that if he heard from the Shechinah at all times and not only at one appointed time, how much more so should he abstain from marital contact. And the Gemara taught that we know that God approved, because in Deuteronomy 5:27, God instructed Moses (after the Revelation at Sinai), "Go say to them, 'Return to your tents'" (thus giving the Israelites permission to resume marital relations) and immediately thereafter in Deuteronomy 5:28, God told Moses, "But as for you, stand here by me" (excluding him from the permission to return). And the Gemara taught that some cite as proof of God's approval God's statement in Numbers 12:8, "with him [Moses] will I speak mouth to mouth" (as God thus distinguished the level of communication God had with Moses, after Miriam and Aaron had raised the marriage of Moses and then questioned the distinctiveness of the prophecy of Moses).

It was taught in a baraita that four types of people are accounted as though they were dead: a poor person, a person affected by skin disease (מְּצֹרָע, metzora), a blind person, and one who is childless. A poor person is accounted as dead, for Exodus 4:19 says, "for all the men are dead who sought your life" (and the Gemara interpreted this to mean that they had been stricken with poverty). A person affected by skin disease (מְּצֹרָע, metzora) is accounted as dead, for Numbers 12:10–12 says, "And Aaron looked on Miriam, and behold, she was leprous (מְצֹרָעַת, metzora'at). And Aaron said to Moses . . . let her not be as one dead." The blind are accounted as dead, for Lamentations 3:6 says, "He has set me in dark places, as they that be dead of old." And one who is childless is accounted as dead, for in Genesis 30:1, Rachel said, "Give me children, or else I am dead."

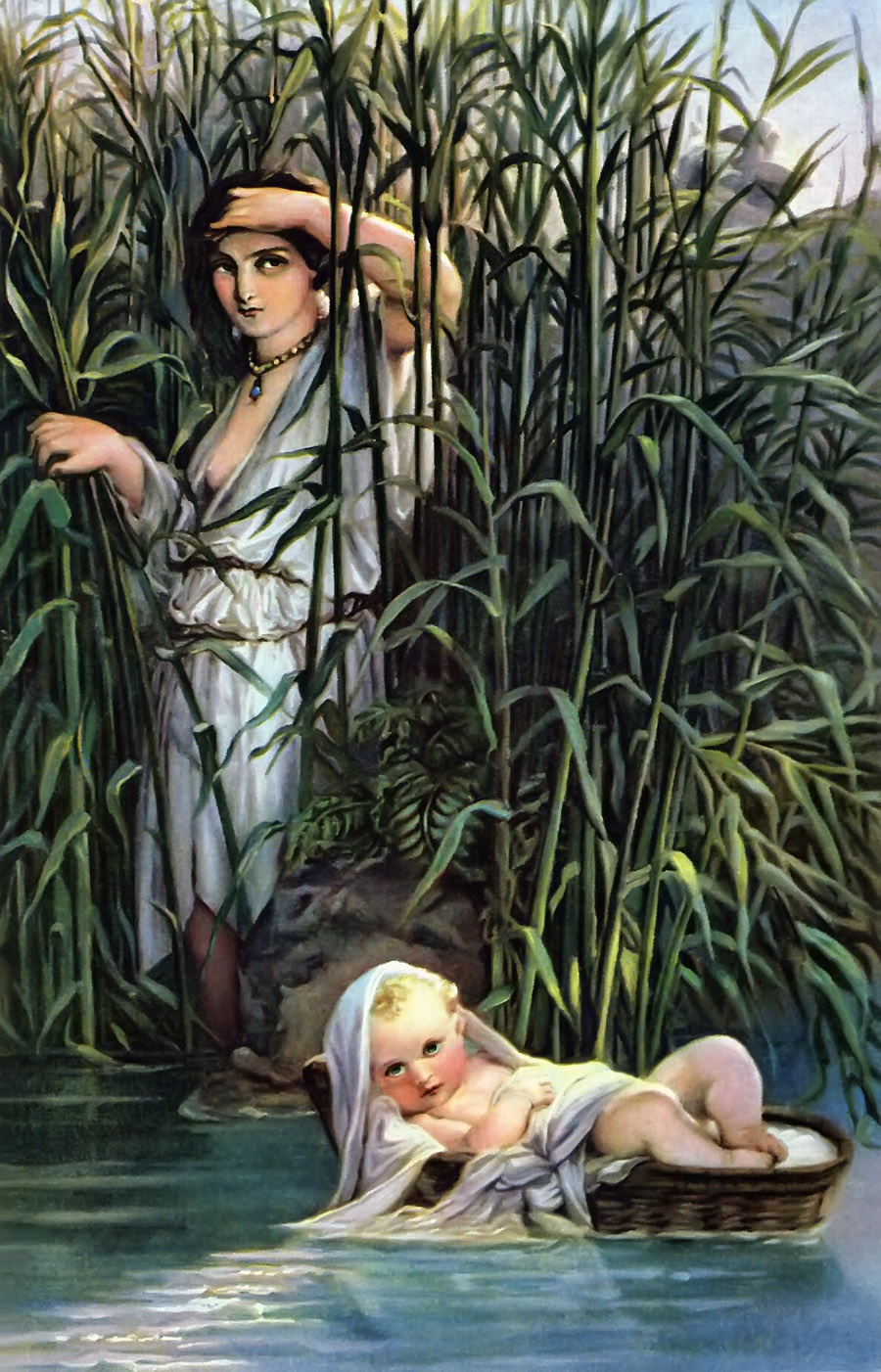
Miriam waiting for the baby Moses in the Nile (19th-century illustration by Hippolyte Delaroche)

Rabbi Ishmael cited Numbers 12:14 as one of ten a fortiori (kal va-chomer) recorded in the Hebrew Bible: (1) In Genesis 44:8, Joseph's brothers told Joseph, "Behold, the money that we found in our sacks' mouths we brought back to you," and they thus reasoned, "how then should we steal?" (2) In Exodus 6:12, Moses told God, "Behold, the children of Israel have not hearkened to me," and reasoned that surely even more, "How then shall Pharaoh hear me?" (3) In Deuteronomy 31:27, Moses said to the Israelites, "Behold, while I am yet alive with you this day, you have been rebellious against the Lord," and reasoned that it would follow, "And how much more after my death?" (4) In Numbers 12:14, "the Lord said to Moses: 'If her (Miriam's) father had but spit in her face,'" surely it would stand to reason, "'Should she not hide in shame seven days?'" (5) In Jeremiah 12:5, the prophet asked, "If you have run with the footmen, and they have wearied you," is it not logical to conclude, "Then how can you contend with horses?" (6) In 1 Samuel 23:3, David's men said to him, "Behold, we are afraid here in Judah," and thus surely it stands to reason, "How much more then if we go to Keilah?" (7) Also in Jeremiah 12:5, the prophet asked, "And if in a land of Peace where you are secure" you are overcome, is it not logical to ask, "How will you do in the thickets of the Jordan?" (8) Proverbs 11:31 reasoned, "Behold, the righteous shall be requited in the earth," and does it not follow, "How much more the wicked and the sinner?" (9) In Esther 9:12, "The king said to Esther the queen: 'The Jews have slain and destroyed 500 men in Shushan the castle,'" and it thus stands to reason, "'What then have they done in the rest of the king's provinces?'" (10) In Ezekiel 15:5, God came to the prophet saying, "Behold, when it was whole, it was usable for no work," and thus surely it is logical to argue, "How much less, when the fire has devoured it, and it is singed?"

The Mishnah cited Numbers 12:15 for the proposition that Providence treats a person measure for measure as that person treats others. And so because, as Exodus 2:4 relates, Miriam waited for the baby Moses in the Nile, so the Israelites waited seven days for Miriam in the wilderness in Numbers 12:15.

== In medieval Jewish interpretation ==
The parashah is discussed in these medieval Jewish sources:

=== Numbers chapter 8 ===
Reading Numbers 8:2, "the seven lamps shall give light in front of the Menorah," Rashbam differed with the midrash (see "In classical rabbinic interpretation" above) and taught that Aaron would tilt the seven lamps so as to cast light on the table.

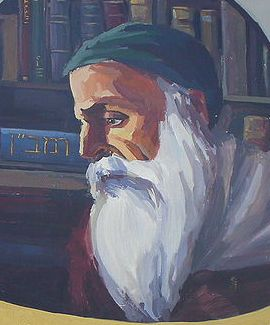
Naḥmanides

Reading the report of Numbers 8:4, "according to the pattern that the Lord had shown Moses, so He made the Menorah," Naḥmanides reported a midrash interpreting the word "He" to refer to God, indicating that God made the Menorah without human intervention.

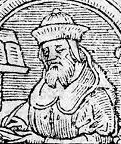
Rashi

Rashi read the instruction of Numbers 8:7, "sprinkle the water of purification on them," to refer to the water mixture made with the ashes of the red heifer described in Numbers 19. Rashi taught that they had to undergo this sprinkling to purify those of them who had become ritually impure because of contact with the dead. And Rashi reported an interpretation by Rabbi Moses HaDarshan (the preacher) that since the Levites were submitted in atonement for the firstborn who had practiced idolatry when they worshipped the Golden Calf (in Exodus 32), and Psalm 106:28 calls idol worship "sacrifices to the dead," and in Numbers 12:12 Moses called one afflicted with skin disease (צָּרַעַת, tzara'at) "as one dead," and Leviticus 14:8 required those afflicted with skin disease to shave, therefore God required the Levites too to shave.

Reading the instruction of Numbers 8:7 with regard to the Levites, "and let them cause a razor to pass over all their flesh," Abraham ibn Ezra taught that they did not shave the corners of their beards (so as not to violate Leviticus 21:5).

Rashi explained that in Numbers 8:8, God required the people to bring a young bull as an offering, because Numbers 15:22–26 required such an offering to make atonement when the community had committed idolatry (and they were atoning for the sin of the Golden Calf). And Rashi explained that in Numbers 8:9–10, God instructed the Israelites to stand and rest their hands on the Levites because the Israelites were also submitting the Levites as their atonement offering.

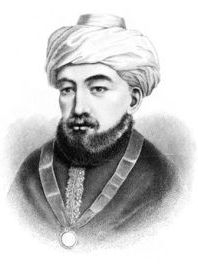
Maimonides

Numbers 8:13–19 refers to duties of the Levites. Maimonides and the siddur report that the Levites would recite the Psalm for the Day in the Temple.

=== Numbers chapter 9 ===
Baḥya ibn Paquda noted that Numbers 9:18, "by the word of God," and Numbers 11:1, "in the ears of God" imply that God has a physical form and body. And Numbers 11:1, "and God heard," implies that God takes bodily actions like human beings. Baḥya explained that necessity brought people to anthropomorphize God and describe God using human attributes so that human listeners could grasp God in their minds. After doing so, people can learn that such description was only metaphorical, and that the truth is too sublime and too remote from their ability to grasp. Baḥya advised the wise to try to remove the husk of the terms and their corporeality and ascend in their minds step by step to reach the true intended meaning according to their ability to grasp it.

Maimonides observed that the words of Numbers 9:18, "At the commandment of the Lord the children of Israel journeyed, and at the commandment of the Lord they pitched," would seem to suffice, and the reader might consider as surplus the details that follow in Numbers 9:19–22, "And when the cloud tarried long. . . And so it was when the cloud was a few days. . . . Or whether it were two days." But Maimonides argued that Scripture adds these details to contradict the view of the nations that the Israelites had lost their way and did not know where to go. Scripture, therefore, states that it was by God's command that the journeyings were irregular, that the Israelites repeatedly returned to the same places, and that they spent different amounts of time in each station. They were not lost, but the journey was directed by "the rising of the pillar of cloud" (Numbers 9:17).

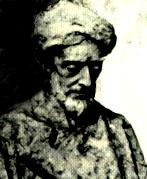
Ibn Gabirol

=== Numbers chapter 11 ===
Reading the report of Numbers 11:4 that "the mixed multitude (הָאסַפְסֻף, hasafsuf) that was among them fell a lusting," Solomon ibn Gabirol confessed poetically that one's poor mortal life, unclean thoughts, craving trinkets and baubles, was like a body with a corrupted heart plagued by a "mixed multitude."

== In modern interpretation ==
The parashah is discussed in these modern sources:

=== Numbers chapter 8 ===
Wenham identified the following chiastic structure in Numbers 8:12–19:

A: "to make atonement for the Levites" (Numbers 8:12)

B: "to do the service of the tent of meeting" (Numbers 8:15)

C: "given to Me" (Numbers 8:16)

D: "instead of all… the firstborn of all the children of Israel" (Numbers 8:16)

E: "For all the firstborn among the children of Israel are Mine…; on the day that I smote all the firstborn in the land of Egypt I sanctified them for Myself." (Numbers 8:17)

D^{1}: "instead of all the firstborn among the children of Israel" (Numbers 8:18)

C^{1}: "given to Aaron" (Numbers 8:19)

B^{1}: "to do the service… in the tent of meeting" (Numbers 8:19)

A^{1}: "to make atonement for the children of Israel" (Numbers 8:19)

=== Numbers chapter 9 ===
Bernard Bamberger noted that Numbers 9:6–8 is one of four episodes in the Torah (along with Leviticus 24:12 and Numbers 15:32–34 and 27:1–5) in which Moses had to make a special inquiry of God before he could give a legal decision. Bamberger reported that the inability of Moses to handle these cases on his own troubled the Rabbis because they relied on a worldview in which the entire Torah was revealed at Sinai with no need for subsequent revelations.

=== Numbers chapter 11 ===
Wenham identified the following chiastic structure in Moses' prayer in Numbers 11:11–15:

A: "dealt ill" (Numbers 11:11)

B: "found favor" (Numbers 11:11)

C: "burden of all this people" (Numbers 11:11)

D: "all this people" (Numbers 11:12)

E: "Carry them… to the land…? From where should I have meat?" (Numbers 11:12–13)

D^{1}: "all this people" (Numbers 11:13)

C^{1}: "to bear all this people" (Numbers 11:14)

B^{1}: "found favor" (Numbers 11:15)

A^{1}: "wretchedness" (Numbers 11:15)

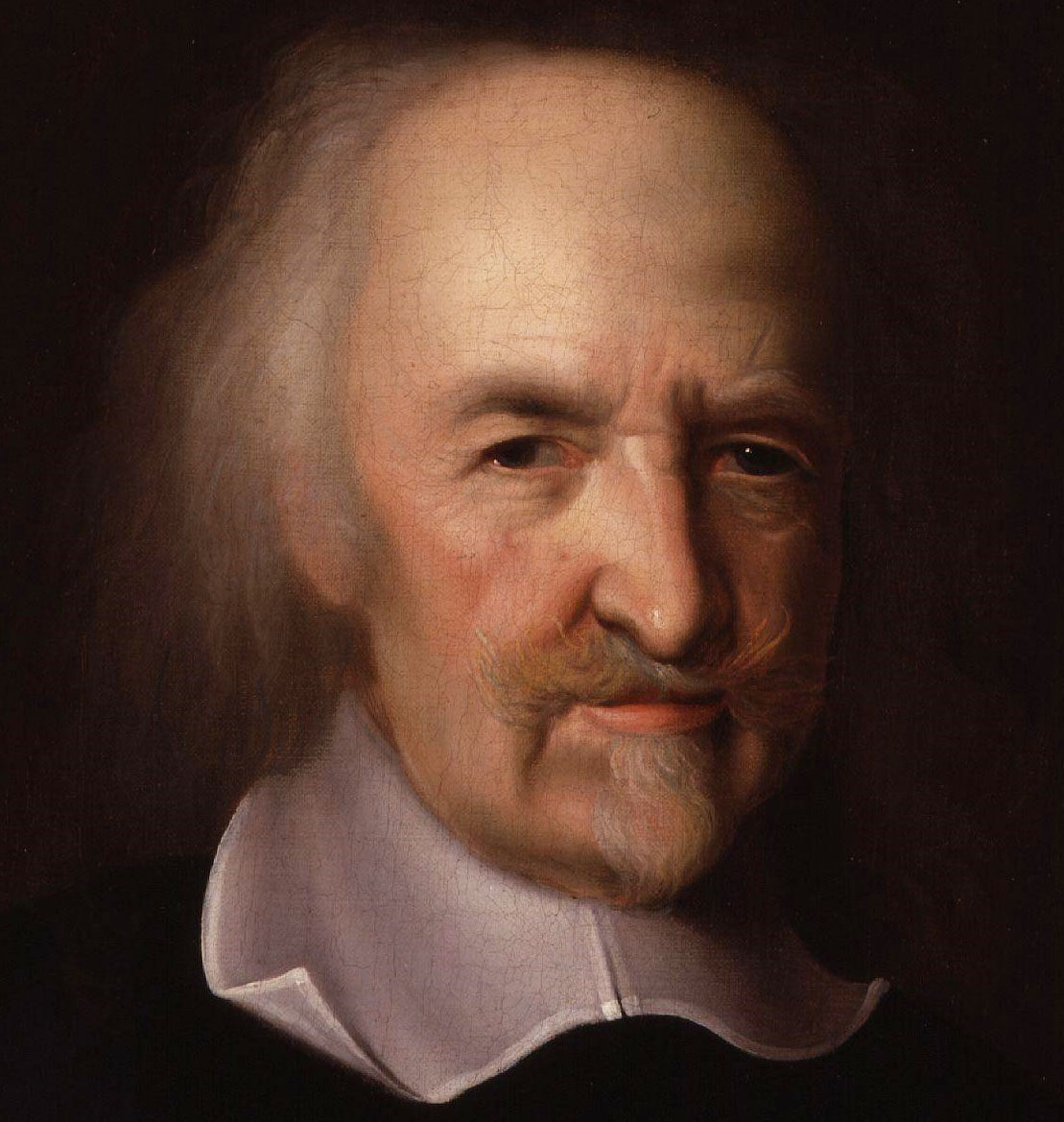
Hobbes

Reading in Numbers 11:25 how God took from the spirit that was in Moses and gave it to the 70 elders, Thomas Hobbes, in Leviathan, argued that the Spirit of God was not divided. Rather, Hobbes read the Scriptural reference to the Spirit of God in a person to mean a person's spirit, inclined toward godliness.

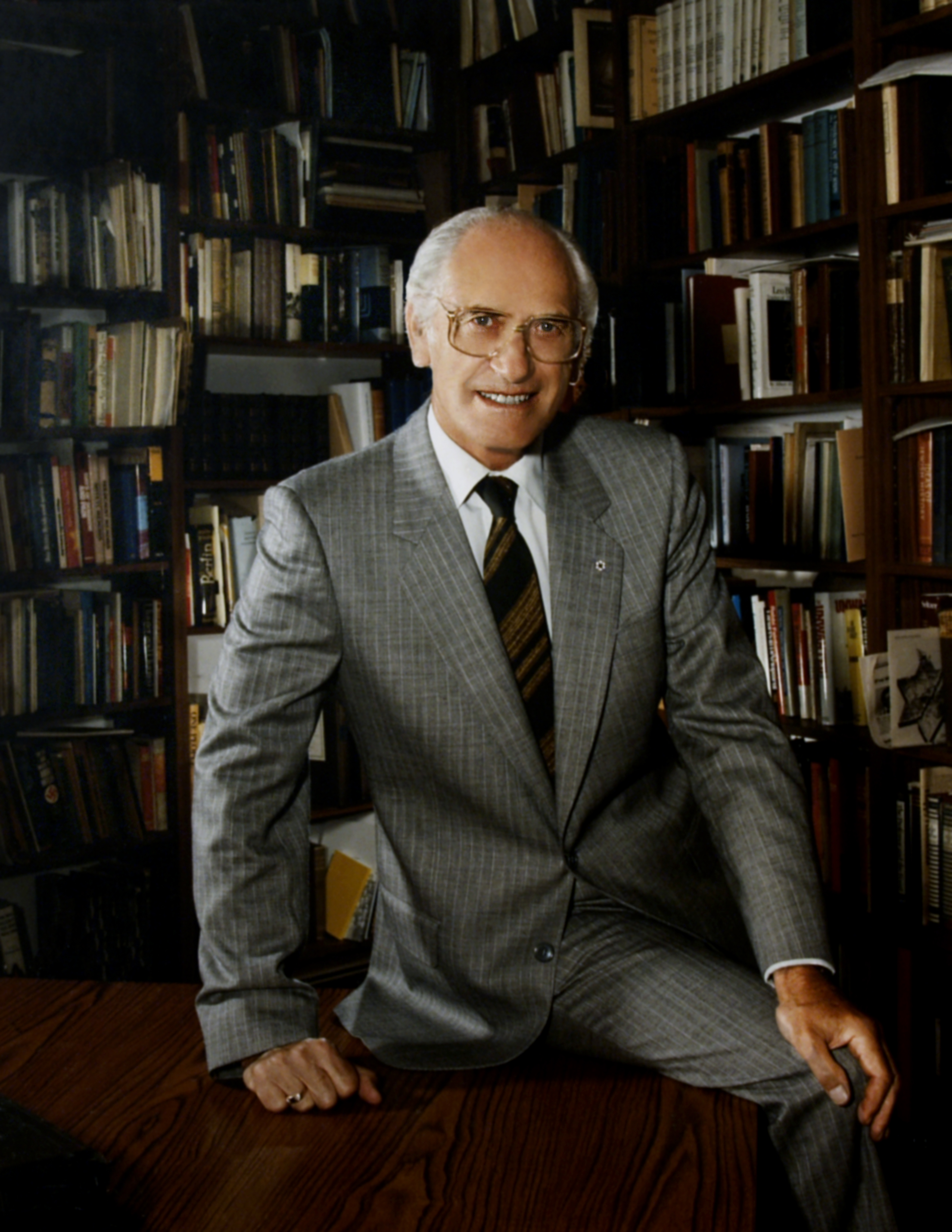
Plaut

Reading the account of Eldad and Medad in Numbers 11:26–29, Gunther Plaut wrote that Moses pointedly rejected a narrow interpretation of prophetic privilege and shared his authority as leader. Jacob Milgrom wrote that God did not restrict God's gifts to particular individuals or classes, and the lesson inspired the prophet Joel to predict in Joel 3:1, "After that, I will pour out My spirit on all flesh; Your sons and daughters shall prophesy…" Dennis Olson wrote that the episode illustrated the need to allow for the possibility that persons outside the institutional leadership of God's people may have genuine words and insights from God. Robert Alter wrote that Moses hyperbolically expressed the sense that holding on to a monopoly of power (equated with access to God's spirit) was not what impelled him, and pointed rather to an ideal of radical spiritual egalitarianism whereby God granted access to the spirit to anyone God chose. Terence Fretheim wrote that Moses shared the charisma of God's spirit and wished that all God's people could receive it. And Nili Fox suggested that the story may reflect an ancient debate about whether there could be only one legitimate prophet at a time, as perhaps implied by Deuteronomy 18:15–18, or if there could be many prophets in a single era.

=== Numbers chapter 12 ===
Masha Turner suggested that one can read the account of Miriam and Moses's wife sympathetically as a case in which God sides with one maligned woman—Moses' wife—against a more powerful one—Miriam.

== Commandments ==
According to both Maimonides and Sefer ha-Chinuch, there are 3 positive and 2 negative commandments in the parashah:

- To slaughter the second Passover lamb
- To eat the second Passover lamb in accordance with the Passover rituals
- Not to leave the second Passover meat over until morning
- Not to break any bones from the second Passover offering
- To sound alarm in times of catastrophe

== In the liturgy ==
Some Jews read "at 50 years old one offers counsel," reflecting the retirement age for Levites in Numbers 8:25, as they study Pirkei Avot chapter 6 on a Sabbath between Passover and Rosh Hashanah.

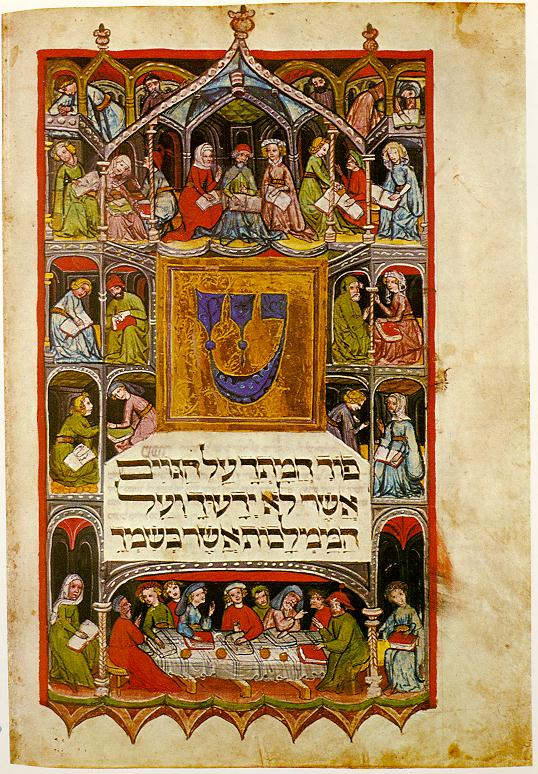
A page from a 14th-century German Haggadah

The laws of the Passover offering in Numbers 9:2 provide an application of the second of the Thirteen Rules for interpreting the Torah in the Baraita of Rabbi Ishmael that many Jews read as part of the readings before the Pesukei dezimra prayer service. The second rule provides that similar words in different contexts invite the reader to find a connection between the two topics. The words "in its proper time" (בְּמוֹעֲדוֹ, bemoado) in Numbers 28:2 indicate that the priests needed to bring the daily offering "in its proper time," even on a Sabbath. Applying the second rule, the same words in Numbers 9:2 mean that the priests needed to bring the Passover offering "in its proper time," even on a Sabbath.

The Passover Haggadah, in the korech section of the Seder, quotes the words "they shall eat it with unleavened bread and bitter herbs" from Numbers 9:11 to support Hillel's practice of combining matzah and maror together in a sandwich.

Jews sing the words "at the commandment of the Lord by the hand of Moses" (עַל-פִּי יְהוָה בְּיַד-מֹשֶׁה, al pi Adonai b'yad Moshe) from Numbers 9:23 while looking at the raised Torah during the lifting of the Torah (Hagbahah) after the Torah reading.

Based on the command of Numbers 10:10 to remember the festivals, on the new month (Rosh Chodesh) and intermediate days (Chol HaMoed) of Passover and Sukkot, Jews add a paragraph to the weekday afternoon (Minchah) Amidah prayer just before the prayer of thanksgiving (Modim).

Jews chant the description of how the Israelites carried the Ark of the Covenant in Numbers 10:35 (קוּמָה יְהוָה, וְיָפֻצוּ אֹיְבֶיךָ, וְיָנֻסוּ מְשַׂנְאֶיךָ, מִפָּנֶיךָ, kumah Adonai, v'yafutzu oyvecha, v'yanusu m'sanecha, mipanecha) during the Torah service when the Ark containing the Torah is opened. And Jews chant the description of how the Israelites set the Ark of the Covenant down in Numbers 10:36 (וּבְנֻחֹה, יֹאמַר: שׁוּבָה יְהוָה, רִבְבוֹת אַלְפֵי יִשְׂרָאֵל, uv'nuchoh yomar: shuvah Adonai, riv'vot alfei Yisrael) during the Torah service when the Torah is returned to the Ark.

The characterization of Moses as God's "trusted servant" in Numbers 12:7 finds reflection shortly after the beginning of the Kedushah section in the Sabbath morning (Shacharit) Amidah prayer.

In the Yigdal hymn, the eighth verse, "God gave His people a Torah of truth, by means of His prophet, the most trusted of His household," reflects Numbers 12:7–8.

The 16th-century Safed Rabbi Eliezer Azikri quoted the words of the prayer of Moses "Please God" (אֵל, נָא, El nah) in Numbers 12:13 in his kabbalistic poem Yedid Nefesh ("Soul's Beloved"), which in turn many congregations chant just before the Kabbalat Shabbat prayer service.

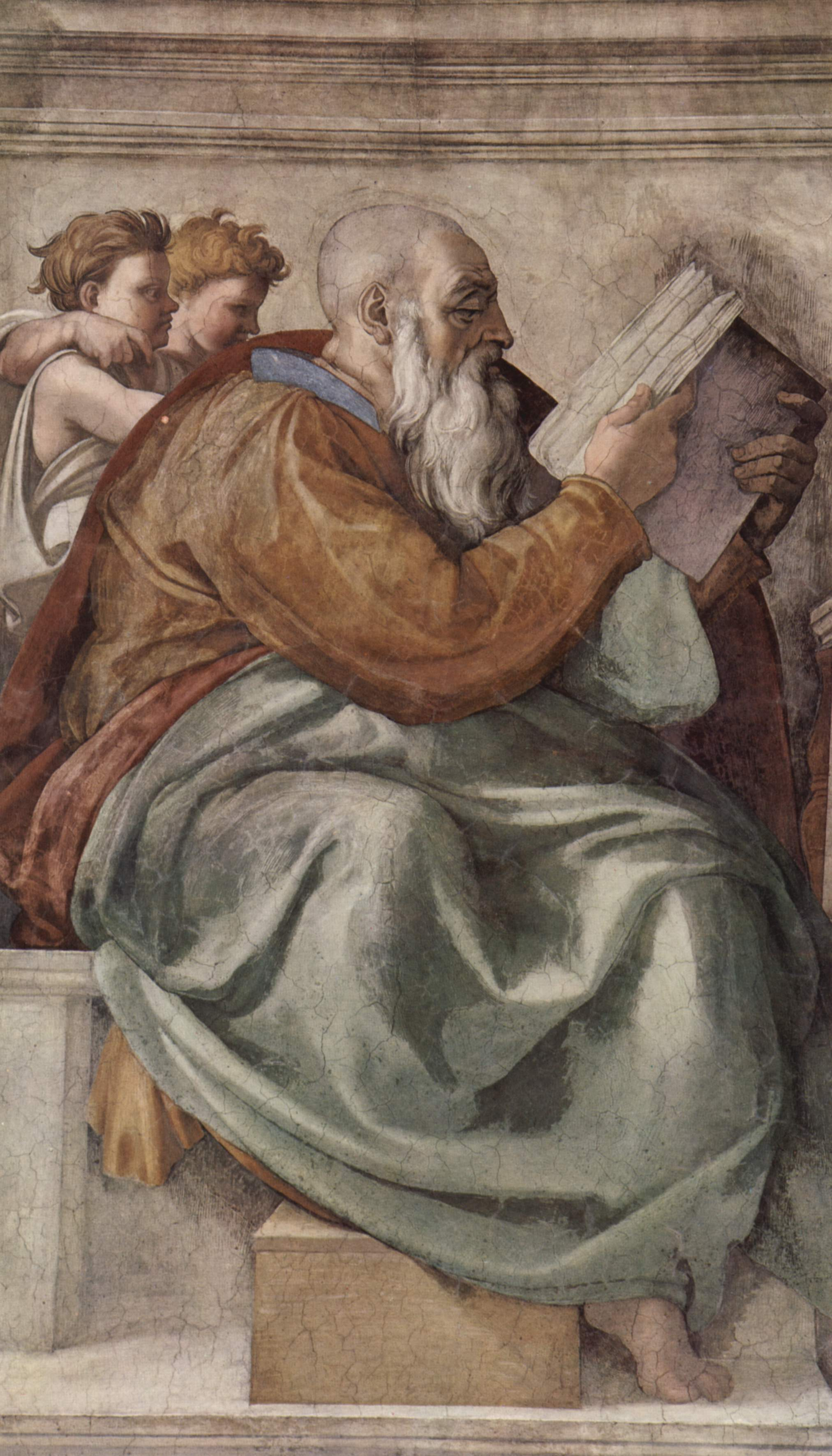
Zechariah (fresco circa 1508–1512 by Michelangelo in the Sistine Chapel)

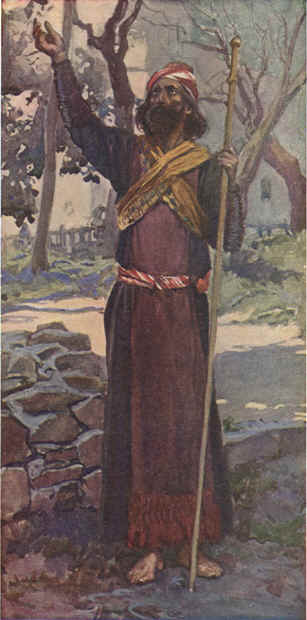
Zechariah (watercolor circa 1896–1902 by James Tissot)

The prayer of Moses for Miriam's health in Numbers 12:13, "Heal her now, O God, I beseech You" (אֵל, נָא רְפָא נָא לָהּ, El, nah r'fah nah lah)—just five simple words in Hebrew—demonstrates that it is not the length of a prayer that matters.

== Haftarah ==
The haftarah for the parashah is Zechariah 2:14–4:7.

=== Connection to the parashah ===
Both the parashah and the haftarah discuss the Menorah. Text of Zechariah shortly after that of the haftarah explains that the lights of the Menorah symbolize God's eyes, keeping watch on the earth. And in the haftarah, God's angel explains the message of Zechariah's vision of the Menorah: "Not by might, nor by power, but by My spirit, says the Lord of hosts." Both the parashah and the haftarah also discuss the purification of priests and their clothes, the parashah in the purification of the Levites and the haftarah in the purification of the High Priest Joshua.
