= Cushan =

Place in the bible

The Hebrew Old Testament name Cushan is probably a poetic or prolonged name of the land of Cush, the Arabian Cush (Habakkuk 3:7). Some have, however, supposed this to be the same as Chushan-Rishathaim (Judges 3:8–10), i.e., taking the latter part of the name as a title or local appellation, Chushan “of the two iniquities” (= oppressing Israel, and provoking them to idolatry), a Mesopotamian king, identified by Rawlinson with Ashur-resh-ishi I (the father of Tiglath Pileser I.); but incorrectly, for the empire of Assyria was not yet founded. He held Israel in bondage for eight years.
