= Abba bar Memel =

Rabbi in Israel

Rabbi Abba bar Memel (or Mamal), or Abba mar Memel, (Hebrew: רבי אבא בר ממל or אבא מר ממל) was a rabbi of the Land of Israel of the second and third generation of amoraim.

He is mentioned often in discussions with the Amora sages of Tiberias Beit Midrash, headed by R. Yochanan bar Nafcha and his students, R. Abbahu, R. Eleazar ben Pedat, and his main scholarly opponent, Rav Zeira. He is also mentioned along with Rabbi Ammi and Rabbi Assi who were considered his masters, probably after the death of R. Yochanan bar Nafcha.

== Teachings ==
In three propositions he limited and rendered practically harmless the application of the Gezerah Shawah, the second of the thirteen hermeneutic rules of R. Ismael, which otherwise might easily have led to arbitrary ritual decisions. His proposed reforms were never carried into practice, no other amora having joined him to form a valid legislative body.

Among his aggadic teachings, the most significant is one on the names of God:

"God spoke to Moses: 'Thou desirest to know My name, I AM THAT I AM That is, I am called according to my revealed activities. When I am judging mankind, I am called Elohim; when I am going out to war against the wicked, I am called Tzevaot; when I am holding judgment in suspense over the sins of men, I am called El Shaddai; when showing mercy to the world, I am called YHWH, because this name de-notes the quality of mercy in God'."
