= Talmudic academies in Syria Palaestina =

Centers for Jewish scholarship in 1st to 5th centuries CE

The Talmudic academies in Syria Palaestina were yeshivot that served as centers for Jewish scholarship and the development of Jewish law in Syria Palaestina (under the Romans), and later Palaestina Prima and Palaestina Secunda. The academies had a major influence on Judaism through the development of the Jerusalem Talmud compiled around 350–400 CE. In later centuries, they were headed by geonim.

== Council of Jamnia ==
The Roman destruction of Jerusalem in 70 CE put an abrupt end to the disputes of the schools as it did to the contests between political factions. Yohanan ben Zakkai, a disciple of Hillel the Elder, founded a new center for Jewish scholarship in Yavne. The seat of the Sanhedrin at Yavne, which at once constituted itself the successor of the Great Sanhedrin of Jerusalem by putting into practice the ordinances of that body as far as was necessary and practicable, attracted prominent scholars those who had escaped the Roman invasion.

Moreover, it reared a new generation of similarly gifted men, whose task it became to overcome the results of the Bar Kokhba revolt. During the interval between these two disasters (56–117), or, more accurately, until the Kitos War under Trajan, the school at Yavne was the recognized tribunal that gathered the traditions of the past and confirmed them; that ruled and regulated existing conditions; and that sowed the seeds for future development. Next to its founder, it owed its splendor and its undisputed supremacy especially to Gamaliel II, a great-grandson of Hillel. To him flocked the pupils of Johanan ben Zakkai and other masters and students of the Law and of Talmudical hermeneutics. Although some of them taught and labored in other places – Eliezer ben Hurcanus in Lod; Joshua ben Hananiah in Peki'in; Rabbi Ishmael in Kfar Aziz, Rabbi Akiva in Bnei Brak; Haninah ben Teradion in Siknin – Yavne remained the center; and in "the vineyard" of Yavne, as they called their place of meeting, they used to assemble for joint action.

== Levantine Judaism restored ==
In the fertile ground of the Yavne Academy the roots of the literature of tradition — Midrash and Mishnah, Talmud and Aggadah — were nourished and strengthened. There, too, the way was paved for a systematic treatment of Halakhah and exegesis. In Yavne were held the decisive debates upon the canonicity of certain Biblical books; there the Jewish liturgy received its permanent form; and there, probably, was edited the Targum on the Pentateuch, which became the foundation for the later Targum named after Onkelos. It was Yavne that inspired and sanctioned the new Greek language version of the Bible — that of Akylas (Aquila of Sinope). The events that preceded and followed the great civil revolution under Bar Kokhba (from the year 117 to about 140) resulted in the decay and death of the school at Yavne. According to tradition, the Sanhedrin was removed from Yavne to Usha, from Usha back to Yavne, and a second time from Yavne to Usha. This final settlement in Usha indicates the ultimate spiritual supremacy of Galilee over Judea, the latter having become depopulated by the war of Hadrian. Usha remained for a long time the seat of the academy; its importance being due to the pupils of Akiba, one of whom, Judah bar Ilai, had his home in Usha. Here was undertaken the great work of the restoration of Levantine Judaism after its disintegration under Hadrian. The study of the Law flourished anew; and Simeon ben Gamliel II, was invested with the rank that had been his father's in Yavne. With him the rank of nasi or patriarch became hereditary in the house of Hillel, and the seat of the academy was made identical with that of the patriarch.

== Location of the Patriarchate ==
In the time of Shimon ben Gamaliel II, the seat of the Patriarchate frequently shifted location; its first move being from Usha to Shefarʻam; thence, under Simeon's son and successor, Judah ha-Nasi, to Beth Sheʿarim; and finally to Sepphoris, where a celebrated disciple of Aqiba, Jose ben Halafta, had been teaching. Only with great difficulty could Shimon ben Gamaliel establish his authority over this pupil of Aqiba, who far outshone him in learning.

Shimon's son, Judah I, however, was fortunate enough to unite with his inherited rank the indisputable reputation of a distinguished scholar, a combination of great importance under the circumstances. Judah, in whom "Torah and dignity" were combined, was the man appointed to close an important epoch and to lay the foundation of a new one. The academy at Sepphoris, to which eminent students from Lower Mesopotamia ("Babylonia") also flocked, erected an indestructible monument to itself through Judah's activity in editing the Mishnah, which attained to canonical standing as the authentic collection of the legal traditions of religious practise. In the Mishna, the completion of which was accomplished soon after the death of its author or editor (about 219), the Talmudic academies of Palestine and Babylonia had a test on which the lectures and the debates of the students were based. The recognition of the Mishna marks a strong dividing line in the history of the Academies and their teachers: it indicates the transition from the age of the Tannaim to that of the Amoraim.

== Centers of learning ==
After Judah's death Sepphoris did not long remain the seat of the patriarch and the academy. Gamaliel III, the unpretentious son of a distinguished father, became patriarch; but Hanina bar Hama succeeded him as head of the school, and introduced the new order of things that commenced with the completion of the Mishnah. In Hanina's lifetime the last migration of the Sanhedrin occurred. His pupil, Johanan bar Nappaha, settled in Tiberias, and the patriarch Judah II (grandson of Judah I) soon found himself compelled to remove to that city. The imposing personality and unexampled learning of Johanan rendered Tiberias for a long period the undisputed center of Levantine Judaism, the magnet which attracted Babylonian students.

When Johanan died in 279—this is the only settled date in the whole chronology of the Amoraim—the renown of the Tiberias Academy was so firmly established that it suffered no deterioration under his successors, although none of them equaled him in learning. For a time, indeed, Caesarea came into prominence, owing solely to the influence of Hoshaya, who lived there in the first half of the third century, and exercised the duties of a teacher contemporaneously with the Church Father Origen, with whom he had personal intercourse. After Johanan's death the school at Cæsarea attained a new standing under his pupil Abbahu; and throughout the whole of the fourth century the opinions of the "sages of Caesarea" were taken into respectful account, even in Tiberias. Sepphoris also resumed its former importance as a seat of learning; and eminent men worked there in the fourth century, long after the disaster to the city wrought by the forces of the emperor Gallus. From the beginning of the third century there had been an academy at Lydda in Judea, or "the South," as Judea was then called. This academy now gained a new reputation as a school of traditional learning. From it came the teacher to whom Jerome owed his knowledge of Hebrew and his insight into the Hebræa Veritas. But neither Caesarea, Sepphoris, nor Lydda could detract from the renown of Tiberias.

Tiberias accordingly remained the abode of the official head of Judaism in the Land of Israel and, in a certain sense, of the Judaism of the whole Roman Empire, as well as the seat of the academy, which considered itself the successor of the ancient Sanhedrin. The right of ordination which, since Shimon ben Gamliel II, the patriarch alone had exercised (either with or without the consent of the Council of Sages), was later on so regulated that the degree could only be conferred by the patriarch and council conjointly. The patriarchal dignity had meanwhile become worldly, as it were; for exceptional learning was by no means held to be an essential attribute of its possessor. The Academy of Tiberias, whose unordained members were called ḥaberim (associates), never lacked men, of more or less ability, who labored and taught in the manner of Johanan. Among these may be mentioned Eleazar ben Pedat, Rabbi Ammi and Rabbi Assi, Hiyya bar Abba, Rav Zeira, Samuel ben Isaac, Jonah, Jose, Jeremiah, Mani, the son of Jonah, and Jose ben Abin, who constitute a series of brilliant names in the field of the Halakah. In the department of the Aggadah—always highly prized and popular in the Land of Israel—the renown of Tiberias was also greatly augmented by many prominent and productive workers, from the contemporaries and pupils of Johanan down to Tanhuma ben Abba, who was illustrious as a collector and an editor of aggadic literature.

== The Jerusalem Talmud ==
The imperishable monument to the school of Tiberias is the Jerusalem Talmud (or Palestinian Talmud), of which Johanan ben Nappaha laid the foundation; for which reason he is generally styled, although erroneously, its redactor or author. In point of fact, however, this work was not completed until nearly a century and a half after Johanan's death; and its close is undoubtedly connected with the extinction of the patriarchal office (about 425). But Tiberias did not therefore cease to be a seat of learning, although very little of its subsequent activity is known.

== The Tiberian punctuation ==
Tiberias was important as the seat of the scholars of the Masoretic Text. In the seventh century, they introduced a system of punctuation destined to aid the proper reading and understanding of the biblical text. This system, which achieved universal recognition, is called the Tiberian punctuation. At Tiberias flourished, about the middle of the eighth century, the Masorete Pinhas, the rosh yeshiva "Head of the Academy", and Asher the Great, forefather of five generations of Masoretes (Nehemiah ben Asher, Moses ben Nehemiah, Asher ben Moses, Moses ben Asher, and Aaron ben Moses ben Asher), was to a certain extent his contemporary. The last-named Aaron ben Moses ben Asher, a contemporary of Saadia Gaon, brought the Tiberian school of Masorites to a distinguished end. Tiberias thereafter ceased to play any part in Jewish learning, until, in the twelfth century, it emerged for a brief period, and again in the sixteenth century, when it became the object of the pious ambition of Joseph Nasi of Naxos.

== See also ==
- Talmudic academies in Babylonia
  - Feroz-Shapur, now Anbar, a town adjacent or identical to Nehardea; the academy of Pumbedita was moved to this town for half of the 6th century
- Palestinian Gaonate
- Mahuza, now al-Mada'in; the academy of Pumbedita was relocated to Mahuza during the time of the amora Rava
  - Nehardea Academy in Nehardea
  - Pumbedita Academy in Pumbedita for most of its history, near what is now Fallujah
  - Pum-Nahara Academy
  - Sura Academy, in Sura, the political center of Jewish Mesopotamia after Nehardea
