= Nitzavim =

Term in Jewish religious reading

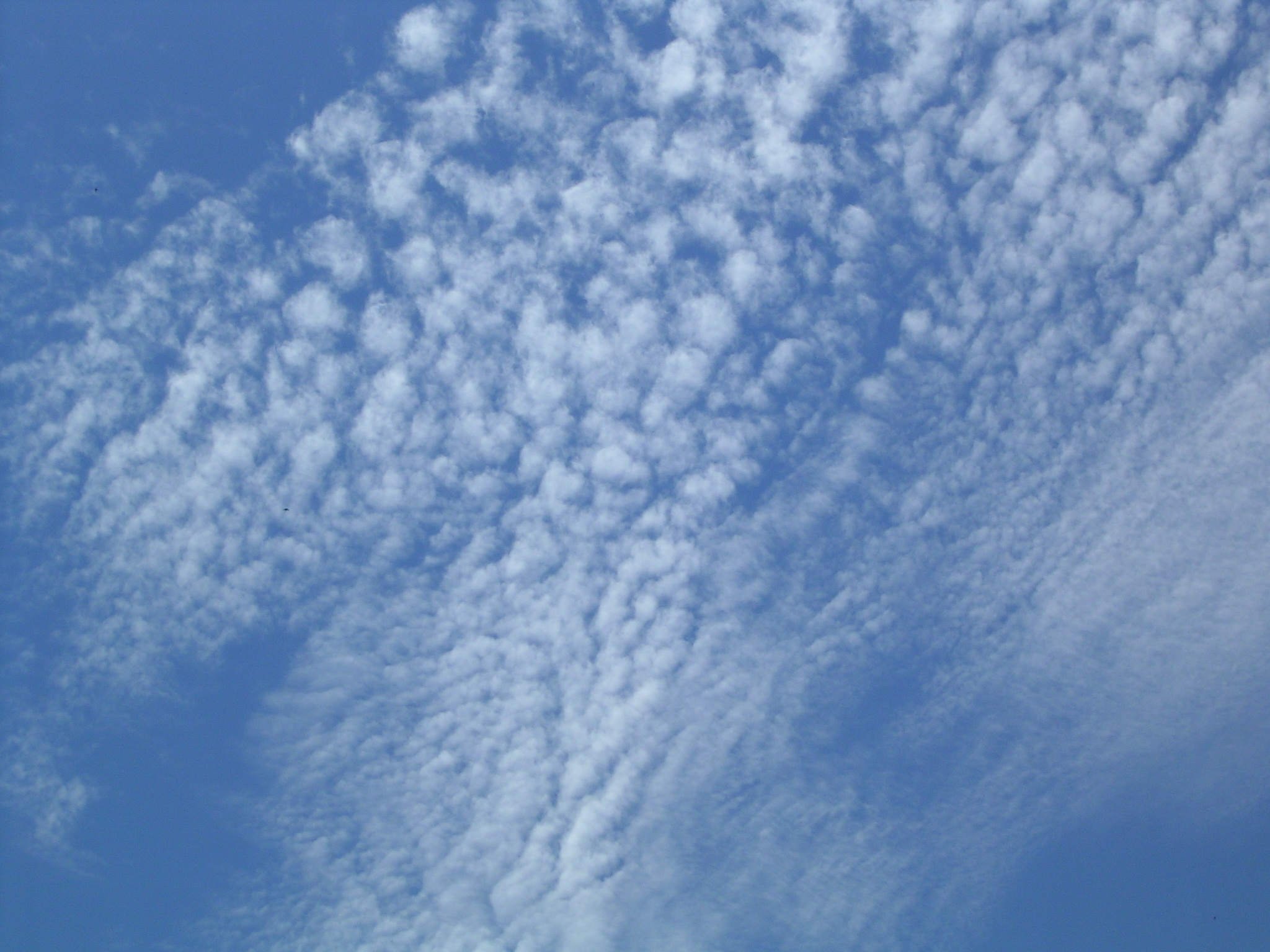
"For this commandment . . . is not in heaven, that you should say: 'Who shall go up for us to heaven, and bring it to us . . . ?'" (Deuteronomy 30:11–12)

Nitzavim, Nitsavim, Nitzabim, Netzavim, Nisavim, or Nesabim (נִצָּבִים—Hebrew for "ones standing," the second word, and the first distinctive word, in the parashah) is the 51st weekly Torah portion (פָּרָשָׁה, parashah) in the annual Jewish cycle of Torah reading and the eighth in the Book of Deuteronomy. It comprises Deuteronomy 29:9–30:20 (Deuteronomy 29:10 onwards in some versions of the Hebrew Bible). In the parashah, Moses told the Israelites that all the people stood before God to enter into the covenant, violation of which would bring on curses, but if they returned to God and heeded God's commandments, then God would take them back in love and bring them together again from the ends of the world. Moses taught that this Instruction was not beyond reach, and Moses put before the Israelites life and death, blessing and curse, and exhorted them to choose life by loving God and heeding the commandments.

The parashah is made up of 2,123 Hebrew letters, 553 Hebrew words, 40 verses, and 72 lines in a Torah Scroll. Jews generally read it in September or, rarely, late August or early October, on the Sabbath immediately before Rosh Hashanah. The lunisolar Hebrew calendar contains 50 weeks in common years, and 54 or 55 weeks in leap years. In some years (for example, 2025), Parashat Nitzavim is read separately. In other years (for example, 2024, 2026, and 2027), Parashat Nitzavim is combined with the next parashah, Vayelech, to help achieve the number of weekly readings needed. The two Torah portions are combined except when two Sabbaths fall between Rosh Hashanah and Sukkot and neither Sabbath coincides with a Holy Day. In the standard Reform prayerbook for the High Holy Days (מחזור, machzor), parts of the parashah, Deuteronomy 29:9–14 and 30:11–20, are the Torah readings for the morning Yom Kippur service, in lieu of the traditional reading of Leviticus 16.

== Readings ==
In traditional Sabbath Torah reading, the parashah is divided into seven readings, or עליות, aliyot. In the Masoretic Text of the Tanakh (Hebrew Bible), Parashat Nitzavim is a single "open portion" (פתוחה, petuchah) (roughly equivalent to a paragraph, often abbreviated with the Hebrew letter פ, peh) and thus can be considered a single unit. Parashat Nitzavim has several further subdivisions, called "closed portion" (סתומה, setumah) divisions (abbreviated with the Hebrew letter ס, samekh). The first closed portion spans the first three readings. The second closed portion spans the fourth and fifth readings. The third closed portion is coincident with the sixth reading.

=== First reading—Deuteronomy 29:9–11 ===
Moses told the Israelites that all the people stood that day before God to enter into the covenant. The first reading ends here.

=== Second reading—Deuteronomy 29:12–14 ===
In the second reading, Moses made the covenant both with those who were standing there that day and with those who were not there that day. The second reading ends here.

=== Third reading—Deuteronomy 29:15–28 ===
In the third reading, Moses reminded the Israelites that they had dwelt in the land of Egypt and had passed through various other nations and had seen the detestable idols of wood, stone, silver, and gold that those other nations kept. Moses speculated that perchance there were among the Israelites some whose hearts were even then turning away from God to go worship the gods of those nations, who might think themselves immune, thinking that they would be safe though they followed their own willful hearts. But God would never forgive them; rather God's anger would rage against them until every curse recorded in the Torah would come down upon them and God had blotted out their names. And later generations and other nations would ask why God had done that to those people, and they would be told that it was because they forsook the covenant that God made with them and turned to other gods. So God grew incensed at that land and brought upon it all the curses recorded in the Torah, uprooted them from their soil in anger, and cast them into another land, as would still be the case. Concealed acts concerned God; but with overt acts, it was for the Israelites to apply all the provisions of the Torah. The third reading and a closed portion end here with the end of chapter 29.

=== Fourth reading—Deuteronomy 30:1–6 ===
In the fourth reading, Moses foretold that, after all these curses had befallen them, if they took them to heart in their exile, and they returned to God, and they heeded God's commandments with all their hearts and souls, then God would restore their fortunes, take them back in love, and bring them together again from the ends of the world to the land that their fathers possessed, and God would make them more prosperous and numerous. Then God would open their hearts to love God with all their hearts and souls, in order that they might live. The fourth reading ends here.

=== Fifth reading—Deuteronomy 30:7–10 ===
In the fifth reading, Moses foretold that God would then inflict all those curses on the enemies who persecuted the Israelites, and would bless the Israelites with abounding prosperity, fertility, and productivity. For God would again delight in their wellbeing, as God had in that of their fathers, since they would be heeding God and keeping the commandments once they had returned to God with all their hearts and souls. The fifth reading and a closed portion end here.

=== Sixth reading—Deuteronomy 30:11–14 ===
In the sixth reading, Moses said that surely, this Instruction that he enjoined upon them was not too baffling, beyond reach, in the heavens, or beyond the sea; rather it was very close to them, in their mouths and hearts. The sixth reading and a closed portion end here.

=== Seventh reading—Deuteronomy 30:15–20 ===
In the seventh reading, which is also the concluding maftir (מפטיר) reading, Moses said that he set before them the choice between life and prosperity on the one hand and death and adversity on the other. Moses commanded them to love God, to walk in God's ways, and to keep God's commandments, that they might thrive and increase, and that God might bless them in the land. But if their hearts turned away and they gave no heed, and were lured into the worship of other gods, Moses warned that they would certainly perish and not long endure in the land. Moses called heaven and earth to witness that he had put before the Israelites a choice between life and death, blessing and curse. He exhorted them to choose life by loving God, heeding the commandments, and holding fast to God, so that they might have life and long endure on the land that God swore to their ancestors, Abraham, Isaac, and Jacob. The seventh reading, the single open portion, and the parashah end here.

=== Readings for Parashiot Nitzavim-Vayelech ===
When Jews read Parashat Nitzavim together with Parashat Vayelech, they divide readings according to the following schedule:

Reading	Verses
1	29:9–28
2	30:1–6
3	30:7–14
4	30:15–31:6
5	31:7–13
6	31:14–19
7	31:20–30
Maftir	31:28–30

=== Readings according to the triennial cycle ===
In years when Jews read the parashah separately, Jews who read the Torah according to the triennial cycle of Torah reading read the entire parashah according to the schedule of first through seventh readings in the text above. When Jews read Parashat Nitzavim together with Parashat Vayelech, Jews who read the Torah according to the triennial cycle can read the parashah according to the following schedule.

	Year 1	Year 2	Year 3
Reading	29:9–30:14	30:1–31:6	31:7–30
1	29:9–11	30:1–3	31:7–9
2	29:12–14	30:4–6	31:10–13
3	29:15–28	30:7–10	31:14–19
4	30:1–3	30:11–14	31:20–22
5	30:4–6	30:15–20	31:22–24
6	30:7–10	31:1–3	31:25–27
7	30:11–14	31:4–6	31:28–30
Maftir	30:11–14	31:4–6	31:28–30

== In inner-biblical interpretation ==
The parashah has parallels or is discussed in these Biblical sources:

=== Deuteronomy chapter 29 ===
In Deuteronomy 29:9–10, Moses cast the net broadly to include in the covenant all in the Israelite camp, including "your stranger" and those in the servant classes of "the hewer of your wood to the drawer of your water." In Joshua 9:3–15, the Gibeonites tricked Joshua into believing that they were not among the local inhabitants whom God had instructed the Israelites to eliminate. In recompense, in Joshua 9:21, the Israelite chieftains decreed that they should become "hewers of wood and drawers of water to all the congregation," and in Joshua 9:27, "Joshua made them that day hewers of wood and drawers of water for the congregation, and for the altar of the Lord." Even so, 2 Samuel 21:2 reports that later in the time of David, "the Gibeonites were not of the children of Israel, but of the remnant of the Amorites."

=== Deuteronomy chapter 30 ===
The exile into captivity which is anticipated in Deuteronomy 30:1 is reported in 2 Kings 24:13-16 and mentioned in Esther 2:6, Jeremiah 1:3 and Ezekiel 1:1. The return to the Promised Land which is anticipated in Deuteronomy 30:3 is predicted, for example, in Jeremiah 33:7.

The command of Deuteronomy 30:16 to "walk in His [God's] ways" reflects a recurring theme also present in Deuteronomy 5:30; 8:6; 10:12; 11:22; 19:9; 26:17; and 28:9.

Moses calls heaven and earth to serve as witnesses against Israel in Deuteronomy 4:26, 30:19, 31:28, and 32:1. Similarly, Psalm 50:4–5 reports that God "summoned the heavens above, and the earth, for the trial of His people," saying "Bring in My devotees, who made a covenant with Me over sacrifice!" Psalm 50:6 continues: "Then the heavens proclaimed His righteousness, for He is a God who judges."

== In early nonrabbinic interpretation ==
The parashah has parallels or is discussed in these early nonrabbinic sources:

=== Deuteronomy chapter 29 ===
One of the Dead Sea Scrolls, the Community Rule (1QS), tells how the Qumran sectarians reenacted the covenant renewal ceremony commanded by Deuteronomy 29:10 on an annual basis, many scholars believe on Shavuot. Another Dead Sea Scroll, The Rule of the Congregation (1QSa), described how the Qumran sectarians planned to reenact that covenant renewal ceremony in the End of Days.

== In classical rabbinic interpretation ==
The parashah is discussed in these rabbinic sources from the era of the Mishnah and the Talmud:

=== Deuteronomy chapter 29 ===
A midrash taught that the words, "You are standing this day all of you before the Lord your God," in Deuteronomy 29:9 should have been placed at the beginning of the Book of Deuteronomy, only the Torah does not follow chronological order. The midrash likened this to the words, "I Kohelet have been King over Israel in Jerusalem," in Ecclesiastes 1:12, which Rabbi Samuel the son of Rabbi Isaac said ought to have been written as a superscription at the beginning of the Book of Ecclesiastes, but is written in Ecclesiastes 1:12 because the Torah does not follow a chronological order.

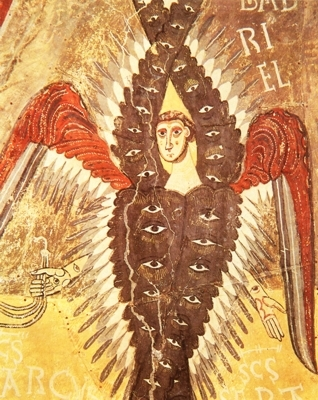
A Seraph (illustration from a medieval manuscript)

A midrash cited Deuteronomy 29:9 as one of several places where Scripture speaks of the people of Israel as it does of angels. For Scripture speaks of both angels and the people of Israel as standing. In reference to angels, Isaiah 6:2 says, "Above Him stood the seraphim," while concerning Israel, Deuteronomy 29:9 says, "You are standing this day." Similarly, Isaiah 6:3 reports that the angels daily proclaim a three-part praise of God, saying, "Holy, holy, holy," and the people of Israel correspondingly daily say in three parts in the Amidah prayer, "The God of Abraham, the God of Isaac, and the God of Jacob." Psalm 104:4 calls the angels "fire," referring to, "The flaming fire Your ministers," and Obadiah 1:18 also calls Israel "fire," saying, "And the house of Jacob shall be a fire." The midrash told how angels renew themselves each day, praise the Lord, and then return to the river of fire from which they emerged, and the Lord renews them and restores them to their former condition; for Lamentations 3:23 reports, "They are new every morning." So also Israel is sunk in iniquity on account of the evil impulse (יֵצֶר הַרַע, yetzer hara), but they do penitence, and God each year (on Yom Kippur) pardons them and renews their heart to fear God; for Ezekiel 36:26 says, "A new heart also will I give you." Hence God compared Israel to angels in Song of Songs 6:10, which calls Israel: "Terrible as an army with banners."

Rabbi Berekiah interpreted Lamentations 3:1, "I am the man (גֶּבֶר, gever) who has seen affliction by the rod of His wrath," to mean that God strengthened the writer (representing the people of God) to withstand all afflictions (interpreting גֶּבֶר, gever, "man," to mean גִּבֹּר, gibor, "strong man"). Rabbi Berekiah noted that after the 98 reproofs in Deuteronomy 28:15–68, Deuteronomy 29:9 says, "You are standing this day all of you," which Rabbi Berekiah taught we render (according to Onkelos), "You endure this day all of you," and thus to mean, "you are strong men to withstand all these reproofs."

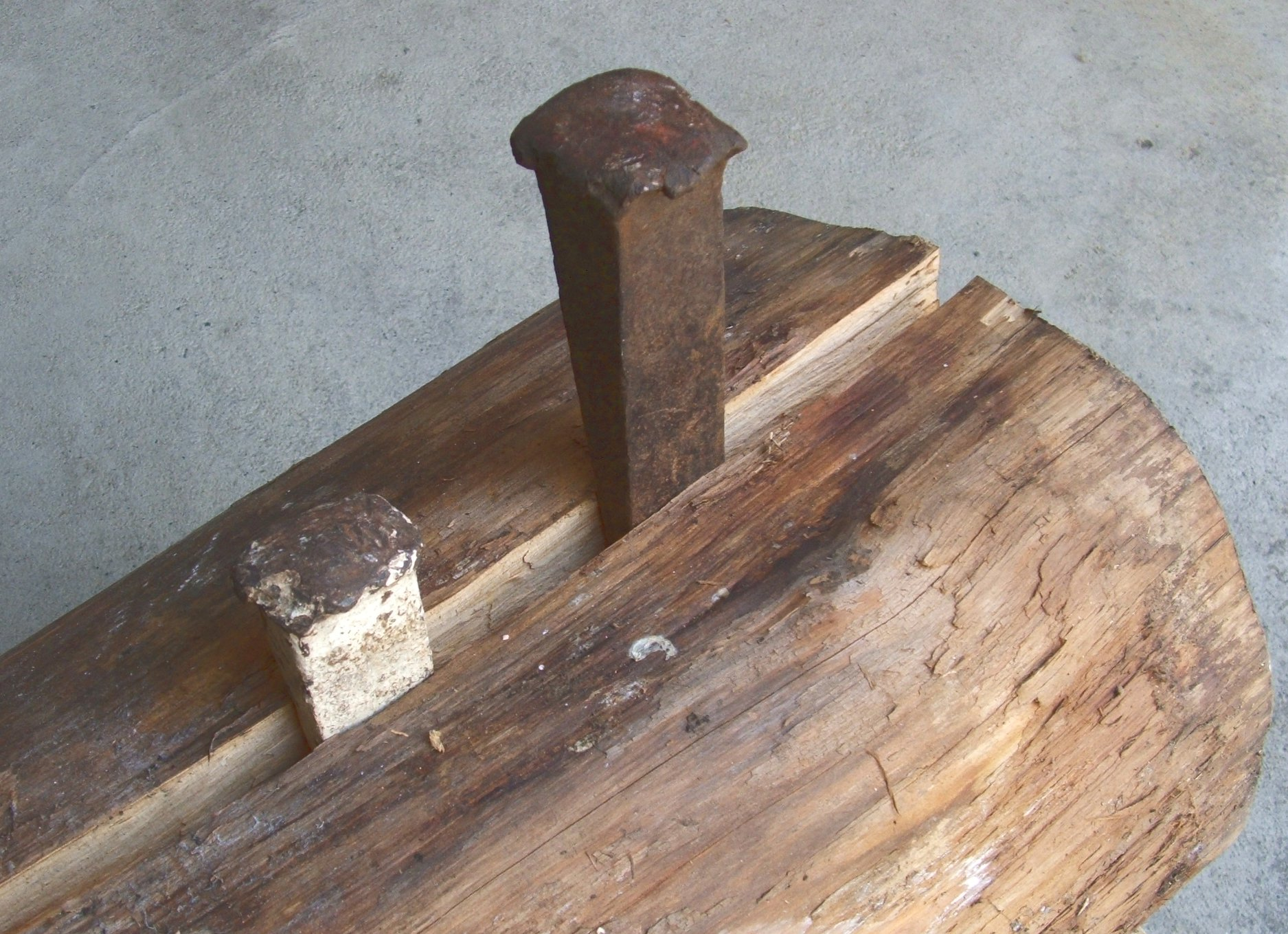
A wood-splitting wedge (photo by Luigi Chiesa)

Similarly, a midrash reported that two teachers offered different explanations of Lamentations 3:12, "He (God) has bent His bow, and set me (וַיַּצִּיבֵנִי, vayatziveni) as a mark for the arrow." One taught that the verse compared Israel to a wedge used to split a log (as the wedge, Israel, is struck, but the log, the enemy, is split). The other taught that the verse compared Israel to a post on which a target for arrows is placed, at which all shoot but which remains standing. Rabbi Judan taught that the verse meant that God strengthened the writer (representing the people of God) to withstand all afflictions (reading וַיַּצִּיבֵנִי, vayatziveni, to mean "He has made me stand firm"). Rabbi Judan noted that after the 98 reproofs in Deuteronomy 28:15–68, Deuteronomy 29:9 says, "You are standing (נִצָּבִים, nizavim) this day all of you," which Rabbi Judan taught we render (according to Onkelos), "you endure this day all of you," and thus to mean, "you are strong men to withstand all these reproofs."

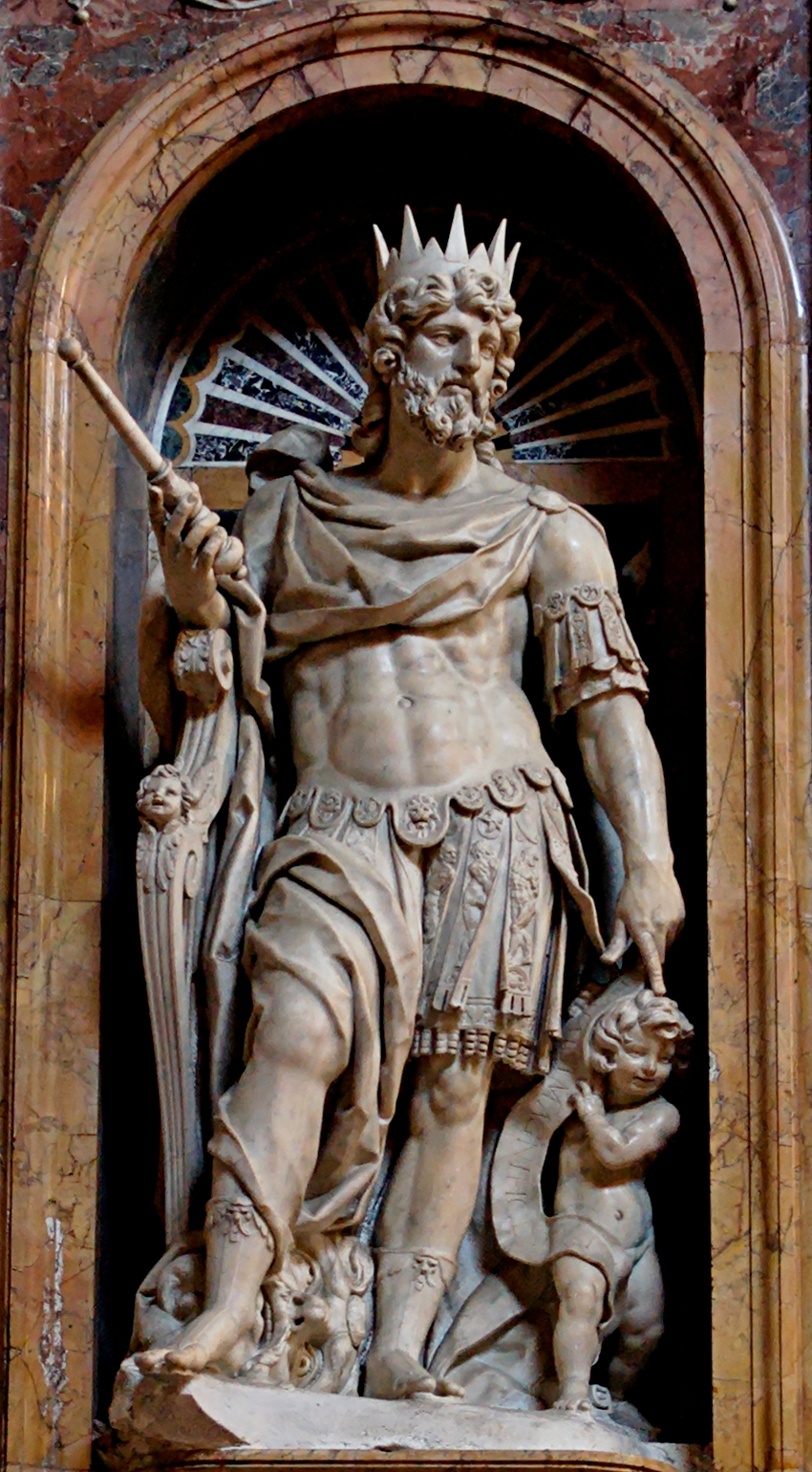
King David (statue in the Basilica di Santa Maria Maggiore)

The Gemara deduced from the separate mention of "all the men of Israel," "your stranger," and "the hewer of your wood to the drawer of your water" in Deuteronomy 29:9–10 that Moses meant to decree that the hewers of wood and the drawers of water (whom the Gemara deduced from Joshua 9:27 were Gibeonites) were to be considered neither Israelites nor converts in that generation. The Gemara further deduced that in Joshua 9:27, Joshua extended that decree of separation for the period during which the Sanctuary existed, and in 2 Samuel 21:2, David extended the decree for all generations.

The school of Rabbi Yannai relied on the reference in Deuteronomy 29:9–10 to "the hewer of your wood to the drawer of your water" to teach that slaves, as well, were children of the Covenant. The school of Rabbi Yannai taught that they could thus serve as agents for the delivery of divorce documents.

The Gemara interpreted the words "not with you alone do I make this covenant" in Deuteronomy 29:13 to teach that Moses adjured the Israelites to agree with the covenant not just as they understood it themselves, but also as Moses understood it, and as God understands it. Based on this reading of Deuteronomy 29:13, a baraita taught that judges would tell defendants that the court administered oaths to them not only according to the defendant's own understanding, but according to the understandings of God and the court.

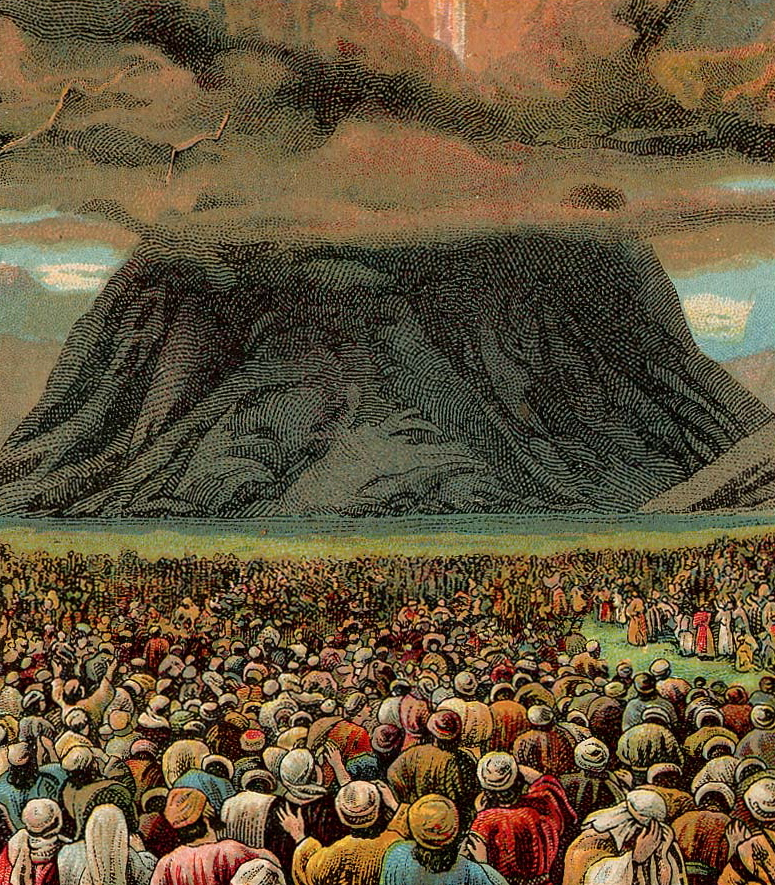
The Revelation at Mount Sinai (illustration from a Bible card published 1907 by the Providence Lithograph Company)

In response to a question from Rav Aha son of Rava, Rav Ashi taught that although later converts to Judaism may not have been literally present at Mount Sinai, Deuteronomy 29:13–14 indicated that their angelic advocates were present when it said: "Neither with you only do I make this covenant and this oath, but with him who stands here with us this day before the Lord our God, and also with him who is not here with us this day."

The Tosefta deduced from Deuteronomy 29:13–14 that the conditions that the Rabbis deduced from the Torah for administering oaths will also apply to future generations and converts.

Similarly, a baraita cited Deuteronomy 29:14 for the proposition that the covenant at Sinai included not only those who were standing by Mount Sinai, but also generations to come and converts who later became Jews. And the baraita taught that they were also bound by commandments promulgated later, such as reading the Scroll of Esther on Purim, because Esther 9:27 reports, "They confirmed and accepted," indicating that the Jewish people confirmed that they had long ago accepted such commandments at Mount Sinai.

A midrash interpreted Deuteronomy 29:13–14 to teach that God made a covenant not only with those at Sinai but also with generations to come. Rabbi Abbahu taught in the name of Rabbi Samuel bar Nachmani that Deuteronomy 29:14 says, "with him who stands here with us this day . . . and also with him who is not here with us this day," because souls were there even though their bodies were not yet created.

Similarly, Rabbi Isaac read Deuteronomy 29:14 to teach that the prophets received from the Revelation at Sinai all the messages that they were to prophesy to subsequent generations. For Deuteronomy 29:14 does not say, "who are not here standing with us this day," but just "who are not with us this day." Rabbi Isaac taught that Deuteronomy 29:14 thus refers to the souls that were to be created thereafter; because these souls did not yet have any substance in them, they could not yet be "standing" at Sinai. But although these souls did not yet exist, they still received their share of the Torah that day. Similarly, Rabbi Isaac concluded that all the Sages who arose in every generation thereafter received their wisdom from the Revelation at Sinai, for Deuteronomy 5:19 says, "These words the Lord spoke to all your assembly . . . with a great voice, and it went on no more", implying that God's Revelation went on no more thereafter.

Reading Deuteronomy 29:14, the Pirke De-Rabbi Eliezer told that at the Revelation at Sinai, when the voice of the first commandment went forth, the heavens and earth quaked, the waters and rivers fled, the mountains and hills moved, all the trees fell prostrate, and the dead who were in Sheol revived and stood on their feet until the end of all the generations. For Deuteronomy 29:14 says, "with him who stands here with us this day." And the Pirke De-Rabbi Eliezer read Deuteronomy 29:14 to teach that those who in the future would be created, until the end of all the generations, also stood there with those at Mount Sinai, as Deuteronomy 29:14 says, "And also with him who is not here with us this day."

The Tosefta deduced from Deuteronomy 29:13–14 that Moses adjured the Israelites on the plains of Moab not according to what was in their hearts, but according to what was in his heart.

The Tosefta cited the words of Deuteronomy 29:16, "you have seen their detestable things, and their idols, wood and stone, silver and gold, which were among them," for the proposition that items that were not used for the body of an idol—items that were merely among idols—were permitted to be used.

In Deuteronomy 29:18, the heart cavils. A midrash catalogued the wide range of additional capabilities of the heart reported in the Hebrew Bible. The heart speaks, sees, hears, walks, falls, stands, rejoices, cries, is comforted, is troubled, becomes hardened, grows faint, grieves, fears, can be broken, becomes proud, rebels, invents, overflows, devises, desires, goes astray, lusts, is refreshed, can be stolen, is humbled, is enticed, errs, trembles, is awakened, loves, hates, envies, is searched, is rent, meditates, is like a fire, is like a stone, turns in repentance, becomes hot, dies, melts, takes in words, is susceptible to fear, gives thanks, covets, becomes hard, makes merry, acts deceitfully, speaks from out of itself, loves bribes, writes words, plans, receives commandments, acts with pride, makes arrangements, and aggrandizes itself.

Rav Judah taught in Rav's name that the words, "that he bless himself in his heart, saying: 'I shall have peace, though I walk in the stubbornness of my heart—that the watered be swept away with the dry'; the Lord will not be willing to pardon him," in Deuteronomy 29:18–19 apply to one who marries his daughter to an old man, or takes a mature wife for his infant son, or returns a lost article to an idolater.

The Mekhilta of Rabbi Simeon bar Yoḥai used the words of Deuteronomy 29:18, "the utter ruin of moist and dry alike," to describe what happened to Pharaoh when he chose to pursue the Israelites after they had left Egypt.

In the Jerusalem Talmud, Rabbi Ḥaninah (or some say Rabbi Joshua ben Levi) deduced from the words "the whole land thereof is brimstone, and salt" in Deuteronomy 29:22 that all the land of Israel was burned, and thus even wicked people buried in the land of Israel before that time will merit to be resurrected, because the burning of the land will have executed on them the punishment that justice demanded. A baraita taught in the name of Rabbi Judah that the land of Israel burned for seven years.

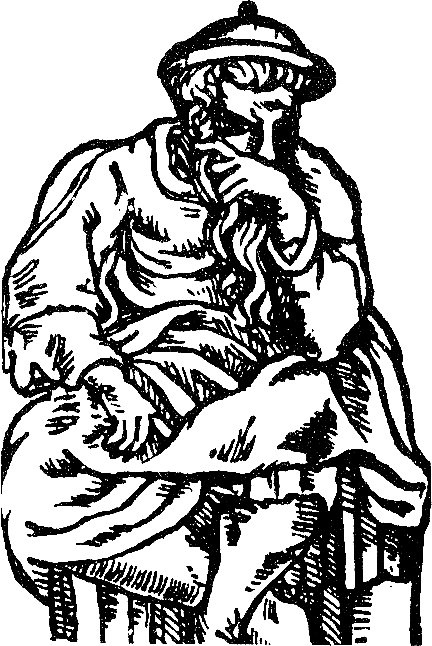
Rabbi Akiva (illustration from the 1568 Mantua Haggadah)

Explaining an assertion by Rabbi Jose, Rabbi Joḥanan deduced from the parallel use of word "covenant" in Deuteronomy 29:24 and Daniel 9:27 that the land sown with "brimstone and salt" foretold in Deuteronomy 29:21–24 was the same seven years of barren soil inflicted by Israel's enemy in Daniel 9:27.

Rabbi Akiva interpreted the words "and [He] cast them into another land, as it is this day" in Deuteronomy 29:27 to teach that the Ten Lost Tribes of Israel were destined not to return. But Rabbi Eliezer interpreted the allusion to "day" in Deuteronomy 29:27 differently, teaching that just as the day darkens and then becomes light again, so even though it went dark for the Ten Tribes, it will become light for them again.

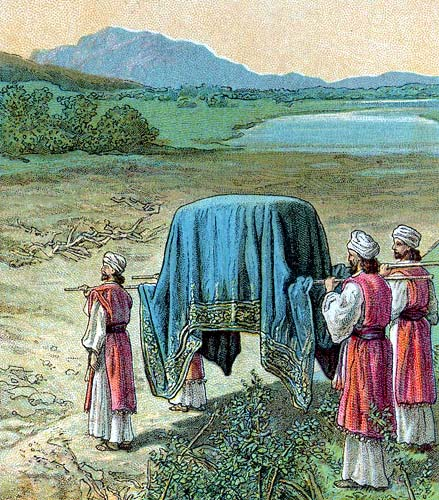
The Ark Crosses the Jordan River (illustration from a Bible card published circa 1896–1913 by the Providence Lithograph Company)

Reading Deuteronomy 29:28, Rabbi Joḥanan said in the name of Rabbi Elazar, son of Rabbi Simeon, that God did not punish the nation as a whole for hidden sins committed by individuals until the Jewish people crossed the Jordan River, as recounted in Joshua 3. Two Tannaim disputed why dots appear in the Masoretic Text over the words "to us and to our children forever" (לָנוּ וּלְבָנֵינוּ, עַד, lanu ulvaneinu ad) in Deuteronomy 29:28. Rabbi Judah said that the dots teach that God would not punish the Israelite community as a whole for transgressions committed in secret until the Israelites had crossed the Jordan River. Rabbi Nehemiah questioned, however, whether God ever punished the Israelite community for transgressions committed in secret, noting that Deuteronomy 29:28 said, "The secret things belong to the Lord our God . . . forever." Rabbi Nehemiah taught that God did not punish the Israelite community for secret transgressions at any time, and God did not punish the Israelite community as a whole for open transgressions until they had crossed the Jordan.

Similarly, in the Jerusalem Talmud, Rabbi Simeon ben Lakish (Resh Lakish) taught that when the Israelites were crossing the Jordan River, they took upon themselves responsibility for each other's hidden sins as well as revealed sins. Joshua told them that if they did not accept responsibility for hidden things, the waters of the Jordan would descend and drown them. Rabbi Simon bar Zabeda agreed, saying that we know that this is true, because Achan sinned in secret after the Israelites crossed the Jordan, and the majority of the Sanhedrin fell at the battle of Ai on account of Achan's sin. Rabbi Levi, however, taught that at Yavneh, the strap was untied, and people were no longer subject to punishment for the private sins of individuals. A Heavenly voice declared that the Israelites no longer needed to get involved in hidden sins or to inquire about them.

Rabbi (Judah the Patriarch) taught that when all Israel stood before Mount Sinai to receive the Torah, they decided unanimously to accept the reign of God joyfully. Furthermore, they pledged themselves responsible for one another. God was willing to make a covenant with the Israelites not only concerning overt acts that God revealed to Israel, but also concerning God's secret acts, reading Deuteronomy 29:28 to say, "The secret things belong to the Lord our God and the things that are revealed." But the Israelites told God that they were ready to make a covenant with God with regard to overt acts, but not with regard to secret acts, lest one Israelite commit a sin secretly and the entire community be held responsible for it.

A midrash offered alternative explanations of why there are points over the words "to us and to our children" (לָנוּ וּלְבָנֵינוּ, lanu ulbaneinu) and over the first letter (עַ, ayin) of the word "to" (עַד, ad) in Deuteronomy 29:28. One explanation: God told the Israelites that they had performed the precepts that had been revealed, and God, on God's part, would make known to them the things that were secret. Another explanation: Ezra (whom some consider the author of these diacritical points, although others regard them as having come from Sinai) reasoned that if Elijah came and asked Ezra why he had written these words, Ezra could answer that he had already placed points over them. And if Elijah told Ezra that he had done well in writing them, then Ezra would erase the points over them. (If Elijah said that the words should not have been written, Ezra could answer that he had dotted them so that people could understand that they were to be disregarded. If Elijah approved of the words, then Ezra could erase the dots.)

The Avot of Rabbi Natan enumerated ten Torah passages marked with dots. The Avot of Rabbi Natan interpreted the dots over Deuteronomy 29:28 to teach that the secret things are not revealed to us in this world, but will be in the world to come.

=== Deuteronomy chapter 30 ===
A midrash interpreted Deuteronomy 30:1–6 to teach that if the Israelites repented while they were in exile, then God would gather them back together, as Deuteronomy 30:1–6 says, "And it shall come to pass, when all these things are come upon you, the blessing and the curse . . . and [you] shall return . . . and hearken to His voice . . . the Lord your God will bring you into the land . . . and the Lord your God will circumcise your heart."

Rabbi Simon ben Yohai deduced from the words "the Lord your God will return [with] your captivity" in Deuteronomy 30:3 that the Shechinah went with the Israelites to every place to which they were exiled and will be with them when they are redeemed in the future. By way of explanation, the baraita noted that Deuteronomy 30:3 did not say "and [God] shall bring back" but "and [God] shall return," teaching that God will return with the Israelites from their places of exile. Rabbi Simon concluded that Deuteronomy 30:3 thus showed how beloved the Children of Israel are in God's sight.

Rabbi Jose bar Ḥaninah deduced from Deuteronomy 30:5 that when the Jews arrived back in the land of Israel in the time of Ezra, they once again became obligated to obey commandments like tithes (מעשרות, ma'asrot). Rabbi Jose bar Ḥaninah reasoned that the words, "And the Lord your God will bring you into the land that your fathers possessed, and you shall possess it," in Deuteronomy 30:5 showed that the Jews' possession of the land in the time of Ezra was comparable to their possession of it in the time of Joshua. And thus, just as Jews in the time of Joshua were obliged to tithe, so Jews in the time of Ezra were obliged to tithe. And the Gemara interpreted the words, "He will do you good, and make you greater than you fathers," in Deuteronomy 30:5 to teach that the Jews of the time of Ezra were still able to enter the land of Israel as their ancestors had, even though the Jews of the time of Ezra bore the yoke of foreign government on their shoulders and their ancestors had not.

A midrash taught that fools enter the synagogue, and seeing people occupying themselves with the law, ask how a person learns the law. They answer that first a person reads from children's materials, then from the Torah, then from the Prophets (נְבִיאִים, Nevi'im), and then from the Writings (כְּתוּבִים, Ketuvim). Then the person learns the Talmud, then the law (הֲלָכָה, halachah), and then the midrash (הגדות, haggadot). Hearing this, fools ask themselves when they can learn all that and turn to leave. Rabbi Jannai compared this to a loaf suspended in the air. The fool exclaims that no one can bring it down. But the wise person says that someone put it there and takes a ladder or stick and brings it down. So fools complain that they are unable to read all the law. But wise people learn a chapter every day until they read all the law. God said in Deuteronomy 30:11, "it is not too hard for you," but if you find it too hard, it is your own fault, because you do not study it.

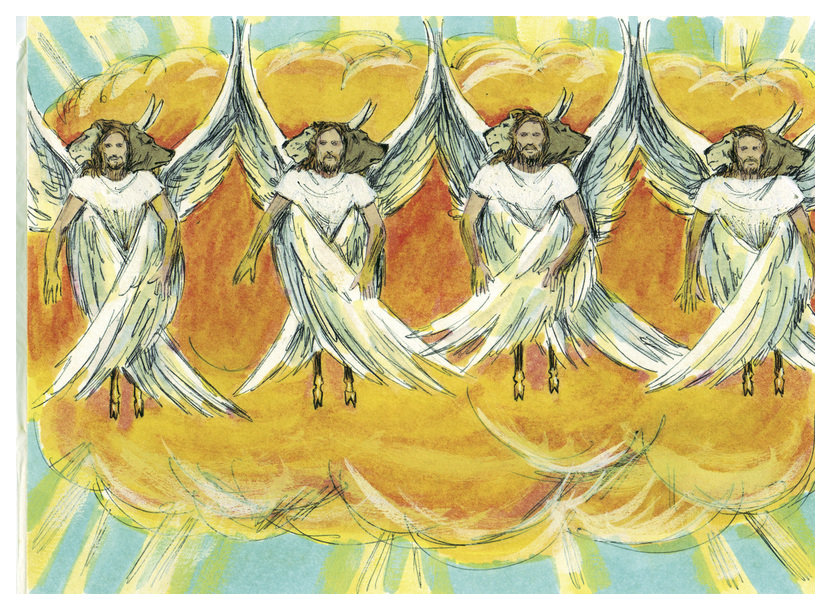
The Four Living Creatures that Ezekiel Saw (1984 illustration by Jim Padgett, courtesy of Sweet Publishing)

A midrash told that if people complained that the Torah disadvantaged them, they should know that God actually gave them the Torah to benefit then. The ministering angels eagerly sought to get the Torah, but God hid it from them, as Job 28:21 says, "Seeing it (that is, Wisdom) is hid from the eyes of all living (חָי, chai)," and חָי, chai, refers to the חַיּוֹת, chayot, the Heavenly living creatures cited in Ezekiel 1:5. Then Job 28:21 continues, "And kept close from the flying beings of the air," and this refers to the angels, as Isaiah 6:6 says, "Then flew to me one of the Seraphim." God told the Israelites that the law was too abstruse for the ministering angels, but not for the Israelites, as Deuteronomy 30:11 says, "this commandment that I command you this day, it is not too hard for you."

Rav Judah taught in the name of Rav that because, as Deuteronomy 30:11–12 reports, the Torah is not in Heaven, God was not able to answer Joshua's questions about the law. Rav Judah reported in the name of Rav that when Moses was dying, he invited Joshua to ask him about any doubts that Joshua might have. Joshua replied by asking Moses whether Joshua had ever left Moses for an hour and gone elsewhere. Joshua asked Moses whether Moses had not written in Exodus 33:11, "The Lord would speak to Moses face to face, as one man speaks to another. . . . But his servant Joshua the son of Nun departed not out of the Tabernacle." Joshua's words wounded Moses, and immediately the strength of Moses waned, and Joshua forgot 300 laws, and 700 doubts concerning laws arose in Joshua's mind. The Israelites then arose to kill Joshua (unless he could resolve these doubts). God then told Joshua that it was not possible to tell him the answers (for, as Deuteronomy 30:11–12 tells, the Torah is not in Heaven). Instead, God then directed Joshua to occupy the Israelites' attention in war, as Joshua 1:1–2 reports.

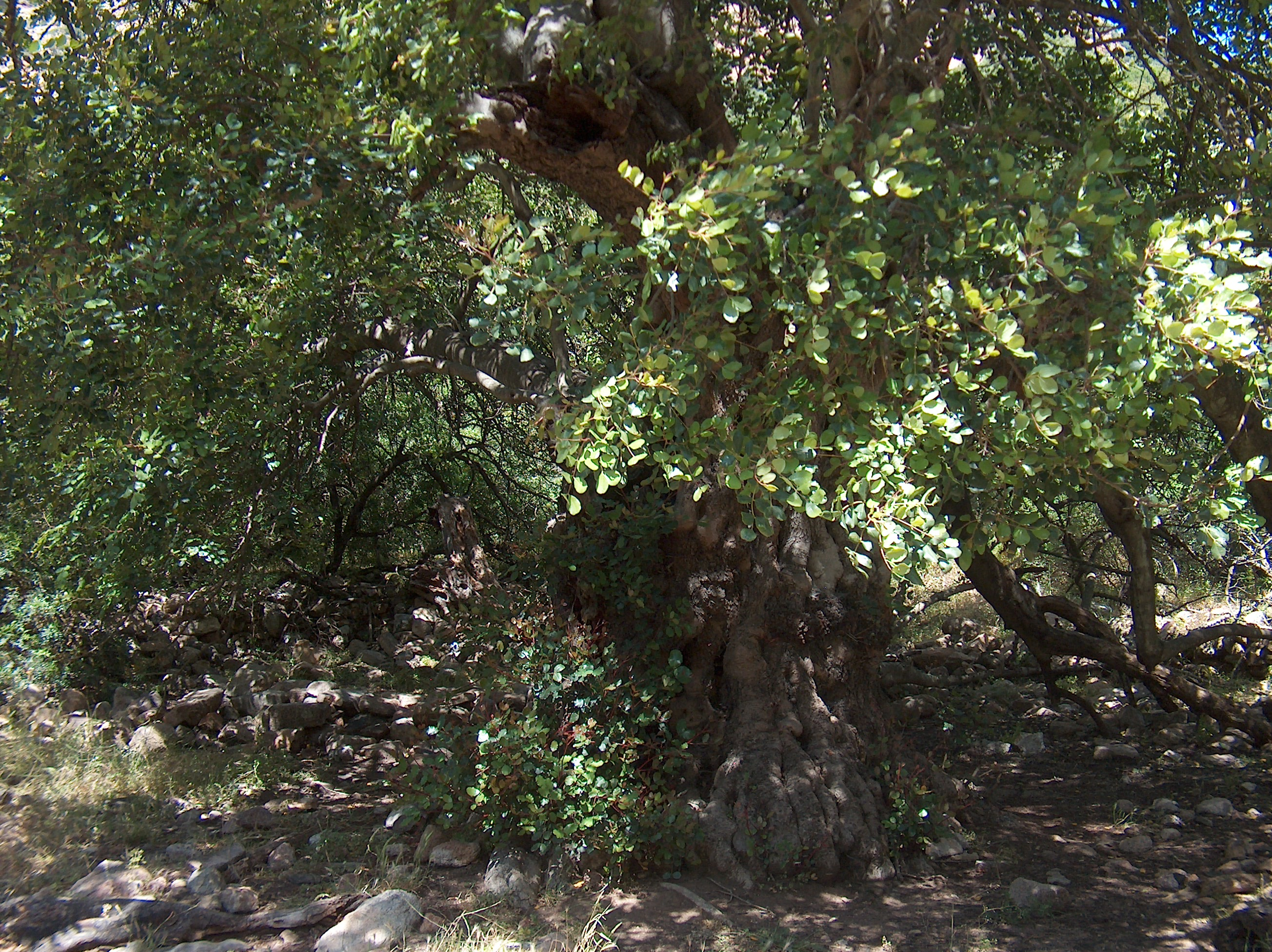
A carob tree

A baraita taught that one day, Rabbi Eliezer employed every imaginable argument for the proposition that a particular type of oven was not susceptible to ritual impurity, but the Sages did not accept his arguments. Then Rabbi Eliezer told the Sages, "If the law agrees with me, then let this carob tree prove it," and the carob tree moved 100 cubits (and others say 400 cubits) out of its place. But the Sages said that no proof can be brought from a carob tree. Then Rabbi Eliezer told the Sages, "If the halachah agrees with me, let this stream of water prove it," and the stream of water flowed backwards. But the Sages said that no proof can be brought from a stream of water. Then Rabbi Eliezer told the Sages, "If the halachah agrees with me, let the walls of this house of study prove it," and the walls leaned over as if to fall. But Rabbi Joshua rebuked the walls, telling them not to interfere with scholars engaged in a halachic dispute. In honor of Rabbi Joshua, the walls did not fall, but in honor of Rabbi Eliezer, the walls did not stand upright, either. Then Rabbi Eliezer told the Sages, "If the halachah agrees with me, let Heaven prove it," and a Heavenly Voice cried out: "Why do you dispute with Rabbi Eliezer, for in all matters the halachah agrees with him!" But Rabbi Joshua rose and exclaimed in the words of Deuteronomy 30:12: "It is not in heaven." Rabbi Jeremiah explained that God had given the Torah at Mount Sinai; Jews pay no attention to Heavenly Voices, for God wrote in Exodus 23:2: "After the majority must one incline." Later, Rabbi Nathan met Elijah and asked him what God did when Rabbi Joshua rose in opposition to the Heavenly Voice. Elijah replied that God laughed with joy, saying, "My children have defeated Me, My children have defeated Me!"

Rav Ḥisda taught that one should use mnemonic devices to learn the Torah. And the Gemara taught that this agrees with Abdimi bar Ḥama bar Dosa, who interpreted Deuteronomy 30:12 to mean that if it were "in heaven," one would have to go up after it, and if it were "beyond the sea," one would have to go overseas after it. Rather, people can learn the Torah using the tools that they find where they are. Rava (or some say Rabbi Joḥanan) interpreted "it is not in heaven" to mean that the Torah is not to be found among those who believe that their insight towers as high as the heavens. And Rava interpreted "neither is it beyond the sea" to mean that it is not to be found among those whose self-esteem expands as the sea. Rabbi Joḥanan (or some say Rava) interpreted "it is not in heaven" to mean that the Torah is not to be found among the arrogant. And Rabbi Joḥanan interpreted "neither is it beyond the sea" to mean that it is not to be found among traveling merchants and business people.

A midrash interpreted the words "For this commandment . . . is not in heaven" in Deuteronomy 30:11–12 to teach that Jews should not look for another Moses to come and bring another Torah from heaven, for no part of the Torah remained in heaven. Rabbi Ḥaninah interpreted the words "For this commandment . . . is not in heaven" in Deuteronomy 30:11–12 to teach that God gave the Torah with all its characteristic teachings of meekness, righteousness, and uprightness, and also its reward. Samuel interpreted the words "For this commandment . . . is not in heaven" in Deuteronomy 30:11–12 to teach that the Torah is not to be found among astrologers who gaze at the heavens. When people countered that Samuel himself was an astrologer and also a great Torah scholar, he replied that he engaged in astrology only when he was free from studying the Torah—when he was in the bath.

Reading Deuteronomy 30:11–14, "For this commandment that I command you this day . . . is very near to you, in your mouth, and in your heart," a midrash related the commandments to the human body. The midrash taught that Deuteronomy 30:11–14 bears out Proverbs 4:22, "For they are life to those who find them, and health to all their flesh." Rabbi Hiyya taught that the law is a salve for the eye, an emollient for a wound, and a root-drink for the bowels. The law is a salve for the eye, as Psalm 19:9 says, "The commandment of the Lord is pure, enlightening the eyes." The law is an emollient for a wound, as Proverbs 3:8 says, "It shall be health to your navel." And the law is a root-drink for the bowels, as Proverbs 3:8 continues, "And marrow to your bones." Another midrash read Deuteronomy 30:11–14, "For this commandment that I command you this day . . . is very near to you, in your mouth," together with Proverbs 4:22, "For they are life to those who find them," to teach that the commandments are life for those who speak them aloud. The midrash related that a disciple of Rabbi Eliezer ben Jacob used to run through all of his study in a single hour, and when once when he fell ill, he forgot all that he had learned, because he did not speak the words out loud. When, however, Rabbi Eliezer ben Jacob prayed for him, all his learning came back to him. Another midrash read Deuteronomy 30:11–14 together with Proverbs 4:22 to teach that the commandments are life to those who tell them to others. Another midrash read Deuteronomy 30:11–14 together with Proverbs 4:22, "For they are life to those who find them," to teach that the commandments are life to those who carry out the commandments completely, for Deuteronomy repeatedly says, "all the commandment" (כָּל-הַמִּצְוָה, kol ha-mitzvah), which the midrash taught means until one completely carries out all the precepts. And the midrash taught that the conclusion of Proverbs 4:22, "health to all their flesh," refers to all the parts of the body, demonstrating the force of Deuteronomy 30:11–14, "For this commandment that I command you this day . . . is very near to you, in your mouth, and in your heart."

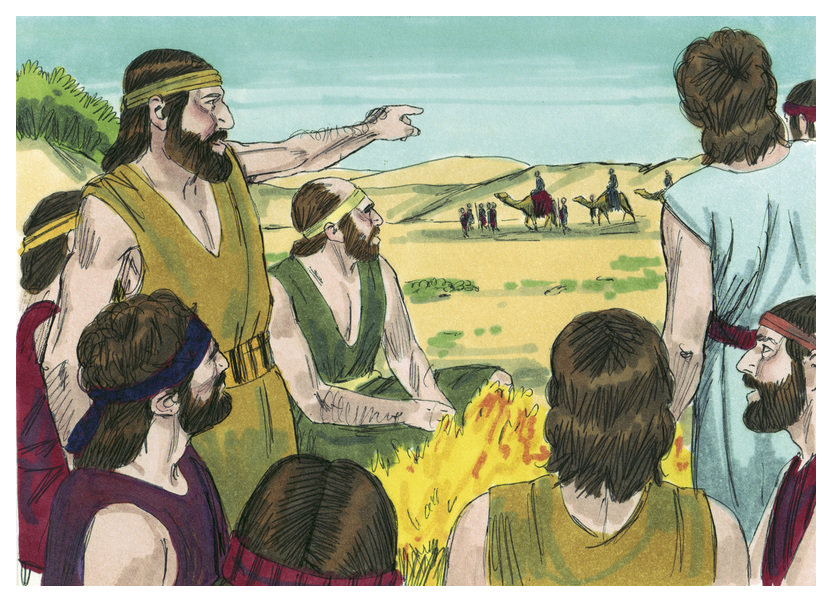
Judah said, "Let us sell him to the Ishmaelites." (Genesis 37:27) (1984 illustration by Jim Padgett, courtesy of Sweet Publishing)

Reading Deuteronomy 30:11–14, "For this commandment that I command you this day . . . is very near to you, in your mouth, and in your heart," a midrash interpreted "heart" and "mouth" to symbolize the beginning and end of fulfilling a precept and thus read Deuteronomy 30:11–14 as an exhortation to complete a good deed once started. Thus Rabbi Hiyya bar Abba taught that if one begins a precept and does not complete it, the result will be that he will bury his wife and children. The midrash cited as support for this proposition the experience of Judah, who began a precept and did not complete it. When Joseph came to his brothers and they sought to kill him, as Joseph's brothers said in Genesis 37:20, "Come now therefore, and let us slay him," Judah did not let them, saying in Genesis 37:26, "What profit is it if we slay our brother?" and they listened to him, for he was their leader. And had Judah called for Joseph's brothers to restore Joseph to their father, they would have listened to him then, as well. Thus because Judah began a precept (the good deed toward Joseph) and did not complete it, he buried his wife and two sons, as Genesis 38:12 reports, "Shua's daughter, the wife of Judah, died," and Genesis 46:12 further reports, "Er and Onan died in the land of Canaan." In another midrash reading "heart" and "mouth" in Deuteronomy 30:11–14 to symbolize the beginning and the end of fulfilling a precept, Rabbi Levi said in the name of Ḥama bar Ḥanina that if one begins a precept and does not complete it, and another comes and completes it, it is attributed to the one who has completed it. The midrash illustrated this by citing how Moses began a precept by taking the bones of Joseph with him, as Exodus 13:19 reports, "And Moses took the bones of Joseph with him." But because Moses never brought Joseph's bones into the Land of Israel, the precept is attributed to the Israelites, who buried them, as Joshua 24:32 reports, "And the bones of Joseph, which the children of Israel brought up out of Egypt, they buried in Shechem." Joshua 24:32 does not say, "Which Moses brought up out of Egypt," but "Which the children of Israel brought up out of Egypt." And the midrash explained that the reason that they buried Joseph's bones in Shechem could be compared to a case in which some thieves stole a cask of wine, and when the owner discovered them, the owner told them that after they had consumed the wine, they needed to return the cask to its proper place. So when the brothers sold Joseph, it was from Shechem that they sold him, as Genesis 37:13 reports, "And Israel said to Joseph: 'Do not your brothers feed the flock in Shechem?'" God told the brothers that since they had sold Joseph from Shechem, they needed to return Joseph's bones to Shechem. And as the Israelites completed the precept, it is called by their name, demonstrating the force of Deuteronomy 30:11–14, "For this commandment that I command you this day . . . is very near to you, in your mouth, and in your heart."

Rabbi Samuel bar Nachmani told a parable to explain the words of Deuteronomy 30:14, "But the word is very near to you, in your mouth, and in your heart, that you may do it." Rabbi Samuel taught that it is as if there were a king's daughter who was not acquainted with any man, and the king had a friend who could visit him at any time, and the princess waited on the friend. The king told the friend that this indicated how much the king loved him, for no one was acquainted with his daughter, yet she waited upon the friend. Similarly, God told Israel that it indicated how beloved Israel was to God, for no being in God's palace was acquainted with the Torah, yet God entrusted it to Israel. As Job 28:21 says, "Seeing it is hid from the eyes of all living," but as for the Children of Israel (as Deuteronomy 30:11–14 says), "It is not too hard for you . . . but the word is very near to you."

Rabbi Ammi expounded on the words, "For it is a pleasant thing if you keep them [words of the wise] within you; let them be established altogether upon your lips," in Proverbs 22:18. He explained that the words of the Torah are "pleasant" when one keeps them within oneself, and one does that when the words are "established altogether upon your lips." Rabbi Isaac said that this may be derived from the words of Deuteronomy 30:14: "But the word is very near to you, in your mouth, and in your heart, that you may do it," for "it is very near to you" when it is "in your mouth and in your heart" to do it. Thus, reading the Torah aloud helps one to keep its precepts in one's heart, and thus to carry them out.

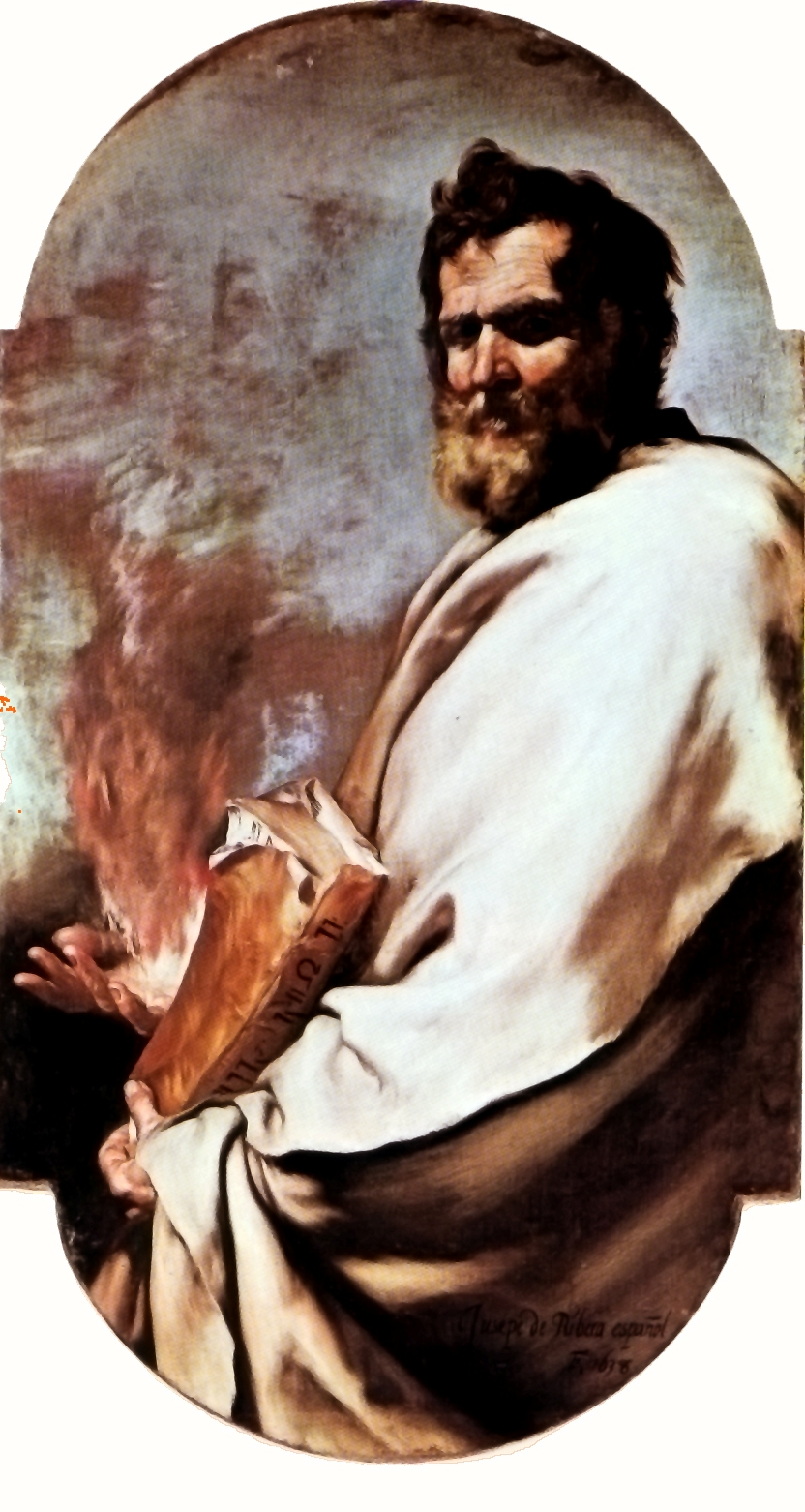
Elijah (1638 painting by Jusepe de Ribera)

The Pirke De-Rabbi Eliezer told that Rabbi Eliezer heard God say the words of Deuteronomy 30:15: "See, I have set before you this day life and good, and death and evil." God said that God had given Israel these two ways, one good, the other evil. The good one is of life, the evil one of death. The good way has two byways, one of righteousness and the other of love, and Elijah stands exactly between the two. When a person comes to enter one of the ways, Elijah cries out in the words of Isaiah 26:2, "Open the gates, that the righteous nation that keeps truth may enter in." Samuel the prophet, placed between the two byways, asked on which of the two byways to go. If he went on the way of righteousness, then the path of love would be better; if he went on the way of love, the way of righteousness would be better. But Samuel said that he would not give up either of them. God told Samuel that because the prophet had placed himself between the two good byways, God would give him three good gifts. Thus, everyone who does righteousness and shows the service of love inherits the three gifts of life, righteousness, and glory (as Proverbs 21:21 promises). Leading to the way of evil are four doors, and at each door stand seven angels—four merciful angels outside, and three cruel angels inside. When a person comes to enter a door, the merciful angels urge the person not to enter but to repent. If the person heeds them and repents, it is well, but if not, they tell the person not to enter the next door. Even as the person is about to enter the fourth door, the merciful angels say that every day God calls on people to return.

The Sifre interpreted the "ways" of God referred to in Deuteronomy 30:16 (as well as Deuteronomy 5:30; 8:6; 10:12; 11:22; 19:9; 26:17; and 28:9) by making reference to Exodus 34:6–7, "The Lord, the Lord, God of mercy and grace, slow to wrath and abundant in mercy and truth, keeping lovingkindness for thousands, forgiving transgression, offense, and sin, and cleansing . . . ." Thus, the Sifre read Joel 3:5, "All who will be called by the name of the Lord shall be delivered," to teach that just as Exodus 34:6 calls God "merciful and gracious," we, too, should be merciful and gracious. And just as Psalm 11:7 says, "The Lord is righteous," we, too, should be righteous.

The Gemara taught that the words "if your heart turns away . . . you will not hear" in Deuteronomy 30:17 can describe Torah study. If one listens to the old, and reviews what one has already learned, then one will perceive new understanding. But if one turns away and does not review what one has learned, then one may not perceive the opportunity for new learning.

Rabbi Haggai taught that not only had God in Deuteronomy 11:26 set two paths before the Israelites, "a blessing and a curse," but God did not administer justice to them according to the strict letter of the law, but allowed them mercy so that they might (in the words of Deuteronomy 30:19) "choose life."

The Sifre explained that Deuteronomy 11:26–28 explicitly says, "I set before you this day a blessing and a curse: the blessing, if you obey the commandments . . . and the curse, if you shall not obey the commandments," because otherwise the Israelites might read Deuteronomy 30:19, "I have set before you life and death, the blessing and the curse," and think that since God set before them both paths, they could go whichever way they chose. Thus, Deuteronomy 30:19 directs explicitly: "choose life."

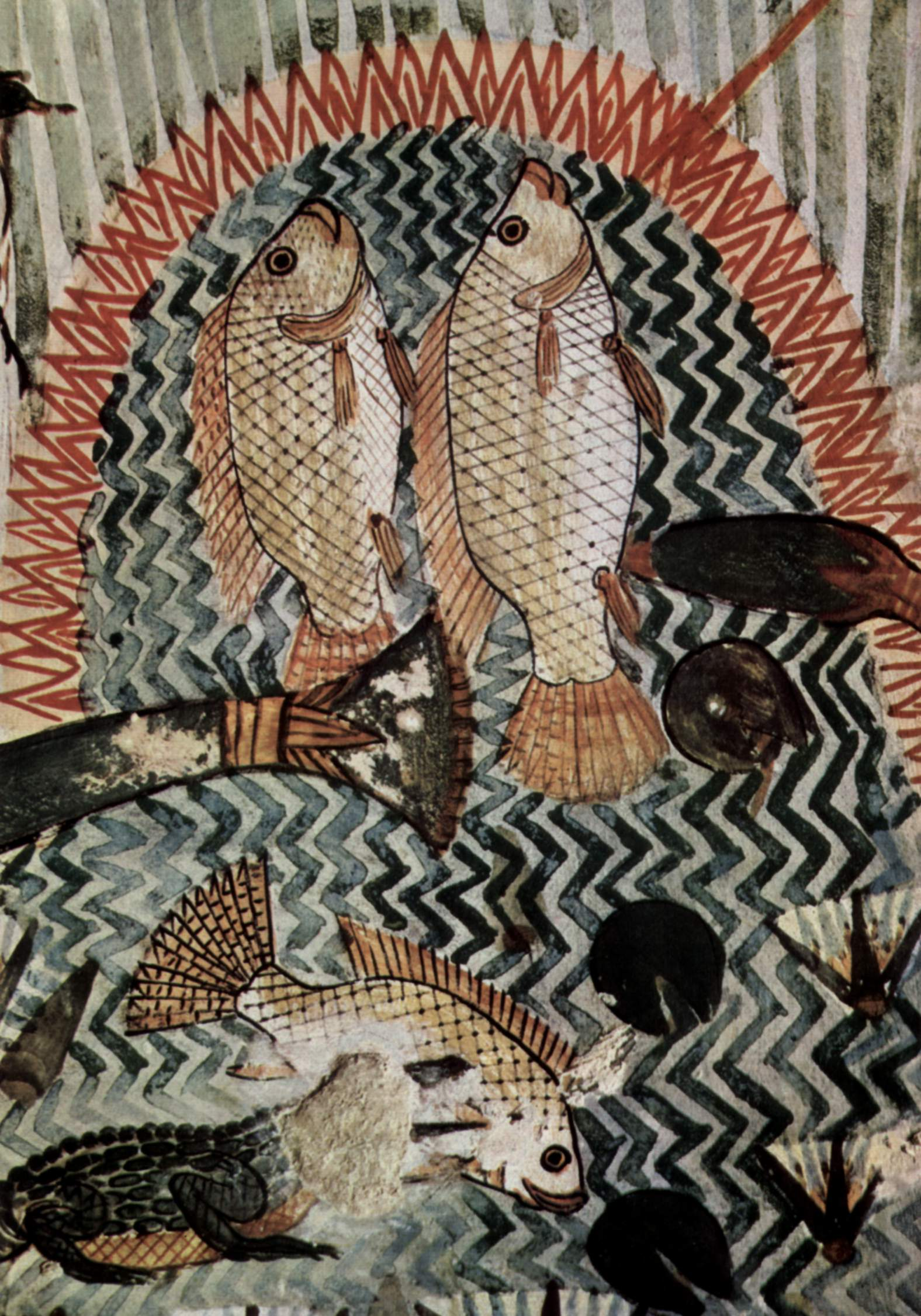
Detail of fish (wall painting from the Egyptian Tomb of Menna circa 1422–1411 B.C.E.)

Rabbi Ishmael deduced from the words "choose life" in Deuteronomy 30:19 that one can learn a trade to earn a livelihood, notwithstanding the admonition of Joshua 1:8 that "you shall contemplate [the Torah] day and night."

Rav Judah interpreted the words "for that is your life and the length of your days" in Deuteronomy 30:20 to teach that refusing to read when one is given a Torah scroll to read is one of three things that shorten a person's days and years (along with refusing to say grace when one is given a cup of benediction and assuming airs of authority).

The Rabbis taught that once the Roman government forbade Jews to study the Torah. Pappus ben Judah found Rabbi Akiva publicly gathering people to study Torah and asked Akiva whether he did not fear the government. Akiva replied with a parable: A fox was once walking alongside of a river, and he saw fish swimming from one place to another. The fox asked the fish from what they fled. The fish replied that they fled from the nets cast by men. The fox invited the fish to come up onto the dry land, so that they could live together as the fox's ancestors had lived with the fish's ancestors. The fish replied that for an animal described as the cleverest of animals, the fox was rather foolish. For if the fish were afraid in the element in which they live, how much more would they fear in the element in which they would die. Akiva said that it was the same with Jews. If such was the Jews' condition when they sat and studied Torah, of which Deuteronomy 30:20 says, "that is your life and the length of your days," how much worse off would Jews be if they neglected the Torah!

A baraita was taught in the Academy of Eliyahu: A certain scholar diligently studied Bible and Mishnah, and greatly served scholars, but nonetheless died young. His wife carried his tefillin to the synagogues and schoolhouses and asked if Deuteronomy 30:20 says, "for that is your life, and the length of your days," why her husband nonetheless died young. No one could answer her. On one occasion, Eliyahu asked her how he was to her during her days of white garments—the seven days after her menstrual period—and she reported that they ate, drank, and slept together without clothing. Eliyahu explained that God must have slain him because he did not sufficiently respect the separation that Leviticus 18:19 requires.

== In medieval Jewish interpretation ==
The parashah is discussed in these medieval Jewish sources:

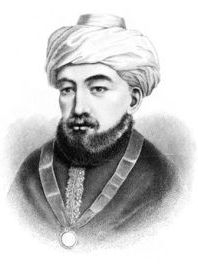
Moses Maimonides

=== Deuteronomy chapter 29 ===
Maimonides read Deuteronomy 29:9–11, "You are standing before the Eternal . . . to establish a covenant," as one of three instances where the Torah refers to the establishment of a covenant regarding the bond between Jews and the Torah.

Baḥya ibn Paquda read Deuteronomy 29:28, "The secret things belong to the Lord, our God," to teach that God knows equally what people reveal and what they conceal, and God will repay people for all that God's omniscience observes in us, even if it remains hidden from other people.

Baḥya also read the words of Deuteronomy 29:28 to provide a reply to the question of why some righteous people do not receive their livelihood except after hard and strenuous toil, while many transgressors are at ease, living a good, pleasant life. For each specific case has its own particular reason, known only to God. Baḥya also read Deuteronomy 29:28 to teach that God sends observable punishments for the commission of observable sins. Baḥya taught that God rewards the fulfillment of observable duties with visible rewards in this world. While for fulfillment of inner, hidden duties, God rewards with hidden rewards, that is, in the World To Come. And God's punishments for hidden and revealed misdeeds is similar. This can be seen in how God has guaranteed to God's people that for their visible service, God will give them visible and swift rewards in this world, as God explained in Leviticus 26:3–12, "If you will go in My ways . . . ." Likewise, for visible sins, God sends visible punishment in this world, because most people understand only what is visible and not what is hidden, as Deuteronomy 29:28 says: "the hidden things belong to God, but the revealed things belong to us and to our children, forever." And Leviticus 20:4 says "if the people will turn their eyes away from the [evil] acts of this man and his family, I will turn My face to this man and his family." Hence, Baḥya taught, the reward and punishment for the fulfillment or transgression of the duties of the heart belongs to God, and consequently, Scripture omits an explanation of their reward and punishment in the World To Come.

=== Deuteronomy chapter 30 ===
Baḥya ibn Paquda read Deuteronomy 30:11 to reduce all religious service to the service of the heart and tongue.

Baḥya cited Deuteronomy 30:14 for the proposition that a tainted motive renders even numerous good deeds unacceptable.

Baḥya noted that one could read Deuteronomy 30:15, "See, I have set before you this day life and good, and death and evil," and Deuteronomy 30:19, "therefore choose life," to imply that people's actions are in their own power, that people can choose as they please, and that their actions flow from free will, and thus that people are liable to reward or punishment for their actions. But other verses imply that all is determined by God. Baḥya taught that the view closest to the way of salvation accepts both human free will and God's determination. Thus, Baḥya counselled that one should act as if actions are left to a human beings' free will and will be rewarded or punished, and that we should strive to do all that will please God. At the same time, one ought to trust in God with the trust of one fully convinced that all things happen by God's decree and that God has a conclusive claim on us, while we have no claim on God.

In his Mishneh Torah, Maimonides hinged his discussion of free will on Deuteronomy 30:15, which says, "Behold, I have set before you today life and good, death and evil." Maimonides taught that God grants free will to all people. One can choose to turn to good or evil.

Maimonides taught that people should not entertain the foolish thesis that at the time of their creation, God decrees whether they will be righteous or wicked (what some call "predestination"). Rather, each person is fit to be righteous or wicked. Jeremiah implied this in Lamentations 3:38: "From the mouth of the Most High, neither evil nor good come forth." Accordingly, sinners, themselves, cause their own loss. It is thus proper for people to mourn for their sins and for the evil consequences that they have brought upon their own souls. Jeremiah continues that since free choice is in our hands and our own decision prompts us to commit wrongs, it is proper for us to repent and abandon our wickedness, for the choice is in our hands. This is implied by Lamentations 3:40, "Let us search and examine our ways and return [to God]."

Maimonides taught that this principle is a pillar on which rests the Torah and the commandments, as Deuteronomy 30:15 says, "Behold, I have set before you today life and good, death and evil," and Deuteronomy 11:26 says, "Behold, I have set before you today the blessing and the curse," implying that the choice is in our hands.

Maimonides argued that the idea that God decrees that an individual is righteous or wicked (as imagined by astrology) is inconsistent with God's command through the prophets to "do this" or "not do this." For according to this mistaken conception, from the beginning of humanity's creation, their nature would draw them to a particular quality and they could not depart from it. Maimonides saw such a view as inconsistent with the entire Torah, with the justice of retribution for the wicked or reward for the righteous, and with the idea that the world's Judge acts justly.

Maimonides taught that even so, nothing happens in the world without God's permission and desire, as Psalm 135:6 says, "Whatever God wishes, He has done in the heavens and in the earth." Maimonides said that everything happens in accord with God's will, and, nevertheless, we are responsible for our deeds. Explaining how this apparent contradiction is resolved, Maimonides said that just as God desired that fire rises upward and water descends downward, so too, God desired that people have free choice and be responsible for their deeds, without being pulled or forced. Rather, people, on their own initiative, with the knowledge that God granted them, do anything that people can do. Therefore, people are judged according to their deeds. If they do good, they are treated with beneficence. If they do bad, they are treated harshly. This is implied by the prophets.

Maimonides acknowledged that one might ask: Since God knows everything that will occur before it comes to pass, does God not know whether a person will be righteous or wicked? And if God knows that a person will be righteous, it would appear impossible for that person not to be righteous. However, if one would say that despite God's knowledge that the person would be righteous it is possible for the person to be wicked, then God's knowledge would be incomplete. Maimonides taught that just as it is beyond human potential to comprehend God's essential nature, as Exodus 33:20 says, "No man will perceive Me and live," so, too, it is beyond human potential to comprehend God's knowledge. This was what Isaiah intended when Isaiah 55:8 says, "For My thoughts are not your thoughts, nor your ways, My ways." Accordingly, we do not have the potential to conceive how God knows all the creations and their deeds. But Maimonides said that it is without doubt that people's actions are in their own hands and God does not decree them. Consequently, the prophets taught that people are judged according to their deeds.

Speaking of duties that benefit or harm only oneself—like fasting, praying, dwelling in a sukkah, taking a lulav, wearing tzitzis, observing the Sabbath and the holidays, refraining from sins—and thus include all duties of the heart, Baḥya ibn Paquda taught that any human action that is either service of God or sin can take place only if three factors occur: (1) the choice in heart and mind, (2) the intent and resolve to do what one chose, and (3) the endeavoring to complete the act with one's physical limbs to bring it into actuality. Of these three factors, Baḥya taught that two are not beyond our control—(1) the choice of service or sin and (2) intent and resolve to carry out the choice. For these, Baḥya argued that trusting in God would be a mistake and foolish, because God left free choice in our hands whether to serve God or rebel against God, as Deuteronomy 30:19 says, "life and death I have set before you and you shall choose life."

Citing Deuteronomy 30:20, Baḥya ibn Paquda taught that love for God is a leading example of a duty of the heart.

== In modern interpretation ==
The parashah is discussed in these modern sources:

=== Deuteronomy chapter 29 ===
Robert Alter read the words of Deuteronomy 29:14, "but with him who is here standing with us this day . . . and with him who is not here with us this day," to state an idea paramount for Deuteronomy's theological-historical project—that the covenant was to be a timeless model to be reenacted by all future generations.

Noting numerous connotations of the word "Torah" (תּוֹרָה) in the Pentateuch, Ephraim Speiser wrote that the word is based on a verbal stem signifying "to teach, guide," and the like. Speiser argued that in Deuteronomy 29:20, the derived noun refers to specified sanctions in a covenant, and in Deuteronomy 30:10, it refers to general instructions and provisions, and in context it cannot be mistaken for the title of the Pentateuch as a whole.

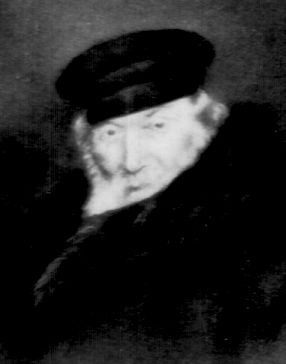
Israel Meir Kagan, author of the Mishnah Berurah

=== Deuteronomy chapter 30 ===
The Mishnah Berurah noted that the first Hebrew letters of the words of Deuteronomy 30:6, אֶת-לְבָבְךָ, וְאֶת-לְבַב, et-levavecha, v'et-levav, "[the Lord your God will circumcise] your heart, and the heart [of your seed, to love the Lord your God with all your heart]," spell out אֱלוּל, Elul, the name of the month that includes Rosh Hashannah and Yom Kippur. The Mishnah Berurah cited this as Scriptural support for the practice of rising early to say prayers for forgiveness (סליחות, Selichot) from the first day of the month of Elul until Yom Kippur.

Noting that the root שׁוּב, shuv—meaning "to turn," "to repent"—appears seven times in Deuteronomy 1–10, Alan Lew read the words of Deuteronomy 30:14, "the thing is very close to you, in your mouth and in your heart," to apply to the repentance that Jews should do as the High Holy Days approach when Jews read Parashat Nitzavim in the synagogue.

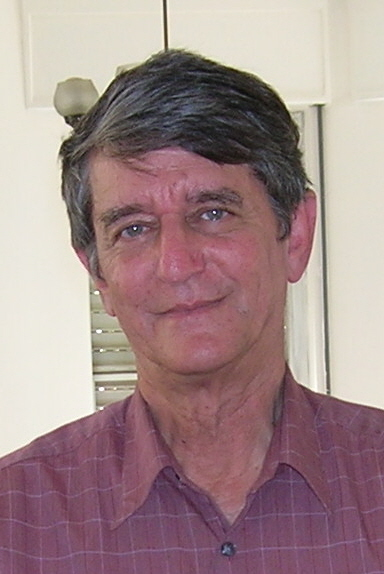
Kugel

Alter saw in Deuteronomy 30:15, "life and good and death and evil" an echo of "the tree of knowledge good and evil" in Genesis 2:17. Alter taught that the point is that good, which may lead to prosperity, is associated with life, just as evil, which may lead to adversity, is associated with death. Alter wrote that the Deuteronomic assumptions about historical causation may seem problematic or even untenable, but the powerful notion of the urgency of moral choice continues to resonate.

James Kugel wrote that the words of Deuteronomy 30:15–20 resounded in the ears of generations of Jews and Christians. Kugel taught that in a sense, all Jewish and Christian devotion—religious services, prayers, the study of Scripture, and dozens of other acts intended to carry out God's will—find at least part of their origin and inspiration in these words.

== Commandments ==
According to Maimonides and the Sefer ha-Chinuch, there are no commandments in the parashah. Nachmanides, reading Deuteronomy 30:11, suggests that Deuteronomy 30:2 contains a commandment of repentance (תשובה, teshuvah).

== In the liturgy ==
The standard Conservative prayerbook quotes Deuteronomy 29:28 and 30:11–14 as readings to accompany the second blessing before the Shema. And then in the daily Shacharit prayer service, just after completing the Shema, in Emet Veyatziv, Jews recite that God's "words are alive and enduring, faithful and desirable forever and to all eternity, for our parents and for us, for our children and for our generations, and for all generations of the seed of Israel, Your servants," and these words are in turn based on the words of Deuteronomy 29:28, "those things that are revealed belong to us and to our children forever, that we may do all the words of this law," in which Jews accept responsibility for the observance of the commandments by all Jews.

== Haftarah ==
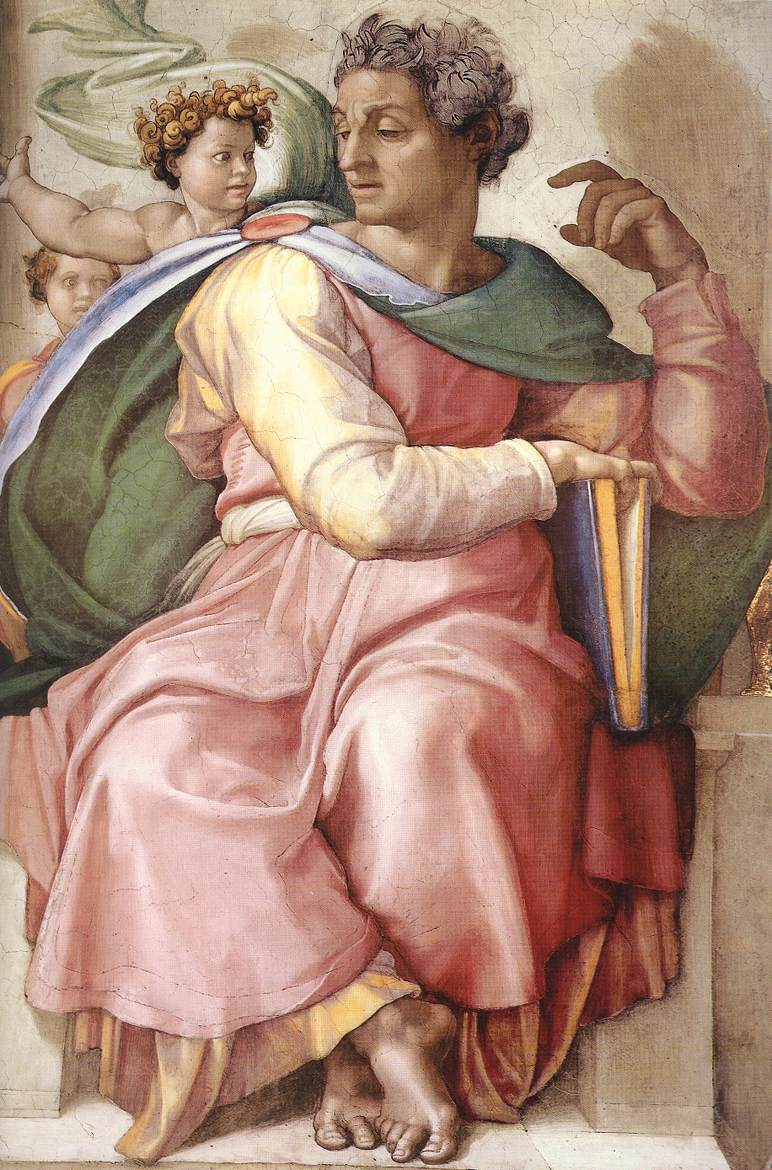
Isaiah (1509 Sistine Chapel fresco by Michelangelo)

The haftarah for the parashah is Isaiah 61:10–63:9. The haftarah is the seventh and concluding installment in the cycle of seven haftarot of consolation after Tisha B'Av, leading up to Rosh Hashanah.

=== Summary ===
The prophet rejoiced in God, who had clothed him with salvation, covered him with victory, as a bridegroom dons a priestly diadem, as a bride adorns herself with jewels. For as the earth brings forth vegetation, so God will cause victory and glory to sprout before the nations.

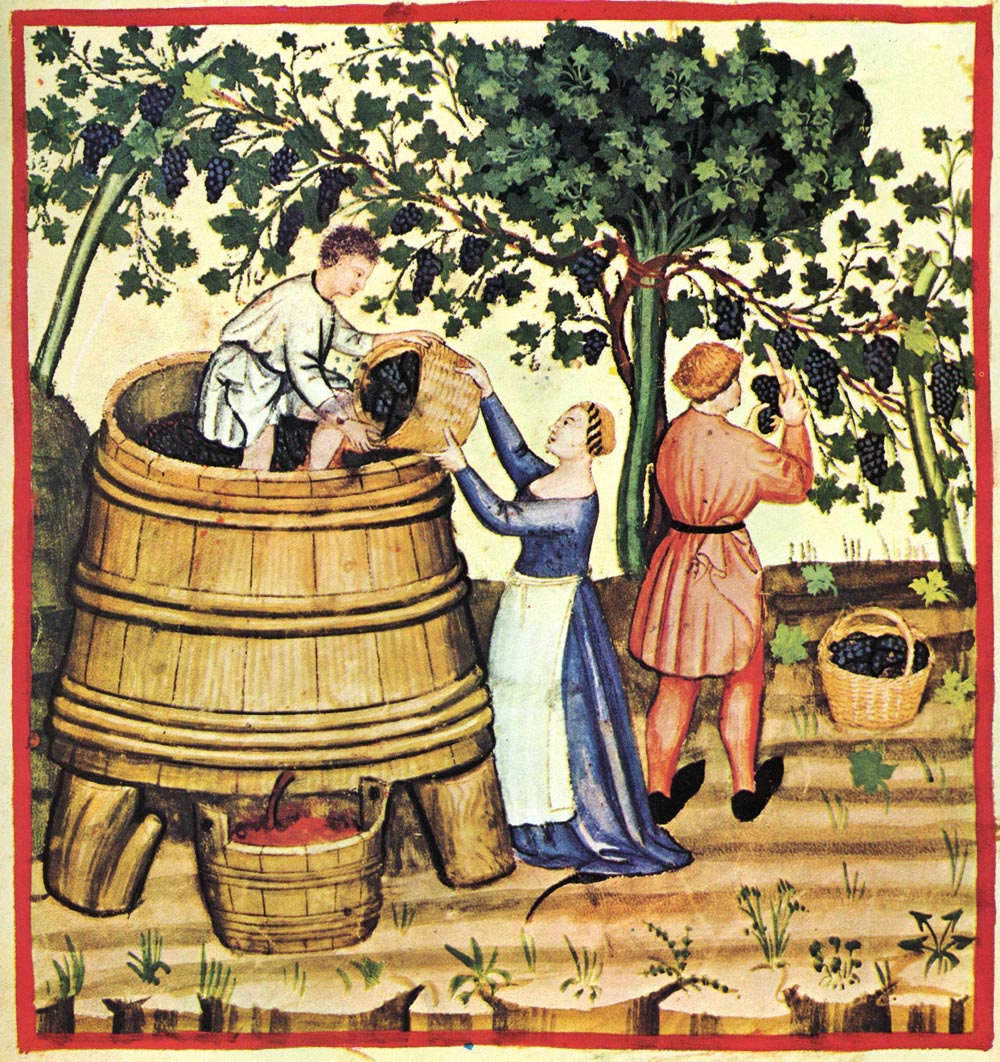
Treading grapes (illustration from the 14th Century book Tacuinum Sanitatis)

For Zion's sake, the prophet would not hold his peace, until Jerusalem's triumph would burn brightly for the nations to see, and Zion would be called by a new name given by God. Zion would be a crown of beauty in God's hand, and no more would she be called Forsaken or Desolate, but she would be called Delight and Espoused, for God would rejoice over her as a bridegroom over his bride.

The prophet set lookouts on Jerusalem's walls, until God would make Jerusalem a praise in the earth. God has sworn no more to give Israel's corn to her enemies, nor her wine to strangers, but those who harvested shall eat, and those who gathered shall drink, in the courts of God's sanctuary.

The prophet said clear the way, for God proclaimed to Zion that her salvation was coming. And they shall call the Israelites the holy people, and Jerusalem shall be called Sought out, not Forsaken.

The prophet asked Who came in crimson garments from Edom, mighty to save, and why God's apparel was red like one who trod in the wine vat. God said that God had trodden the winepress in anger alone, and trampled in fury, for the day of vengeance was in God's heart, and God's year of redemption had come. God looked and found none to help to uphold God's will, so God trod down the peoples in anger, and poured out their blood.

The prophet spoke of God's mercies and praises, of God's great goodness toward Israel, which God bestowed with compassion. For God said, "Surely, they are My people," and so God was their Savior. In all their affliction God was afflicted, and God's angel saved them; in love and pity God redeemed them, and God bore them and carried them all the days of old.

=== Connection to the Special Sabbath ===
Concluding the series of consolation after Tisha B'Av, and leading up to the Days of Awe, the haftarah features God's salvation, redemption, mercies, and compassion.
