= Jose bar Hanina =

Member of the second generation of the Amoraim

Rabbi Jose bar Hanina (Jewish Babylonian Aramaic: רבי יוסי בר חנינא, read as Rabbi Yossi bar Hanina) was an amora of the Land of Israel, from the second generation of the Amoraim.

== Biography ==
He was a disciple of R. Yochanan bar Nafcha, and served as a dayan (religious judge). He was ordained as a rabbi by his own rabbi—Yochanan bar Nafcha. He became a leading Torah sage, with Rabbi Assi calling him a "great man". Later he became a "Talmid Haver", a colleague-disciple, to Yochanan bar Nafcha, and even disputed and debated him in halakhic matters. This is how he also got to know R. Shimon ben Lakish and R. Eleazar ben Pedat, whom he also disputed and debated in halakha. The Talmud cites him many times, and other amoraim delivered halachic teachings in his name, among them R. Abbahu and R. Hamma bar Ukba. In addition, some of his aggadic teachings are recorded.
