= Pedat ben Eleazar =

Pedat ben Eleazar (Hebrew: רבי פדת בן אלעזר) was a Jewish Talmudist who lived in the Land of Israel in the early 4th century (4th generation of amoraim).

== Biography ==
He was the student of his father, Rabbi Eleazar ben Pedat, and the assistant lecturer ("amora") of R. Assi. If the latter asked him to repeat any of his father's sentences, if he himself had heard them from the lips of his father, he introduced them with the words: "So says my teacher in the name of my father", but in other cases he said: "So says my teacher in the name of R. Eleazar." He transmitted also teachings in the name of his father and of Hoshaiah II.

Pedat was an intimate friend of Zeira and Jeremiah ben Eleazar, who transmitted halakhic teachings of his. Several of his aggadic interpretations have been preserved, including the following: "Deuteronomy 1:17 does not indicate presumption on the part of Moses. On the contrary, he means to say: 'Bring difficult questions to me: I will decide them, if I can; if I can not, I will hear them and lay them before God for his decision'". He remarks, in connection with Genesis 1:2: "It is a law of nature that the air moves on the surface of the water, even when the sun is shining with its greatest heat".
