= Zeira =

Rabbi and Amora

- רבי זירא

Personal life
- Born: Zeira
- Died: Land of Israel
- Era: Third generation of Amoraim

Religious life
- Religion: Judaism

Rabbi Zeira (Hebrew: רבי זירא), known before his semikhah as Rav Zeira (Hebrew: רב זירא) and known in the Jerusalem Talmud as Rabbi Ze'era (Hebrew: רבי זעירא), was a Jewish Talmudist of the third generation of Amoraim who lived in the Land of Israel.

== Biography ==
He was born in Babylonia, where he spent his early youth. He was a pupil of Ḥisda, of Huna, and of Judah b. Ezekiel in Pumbedita.

He associated also with other prominent teachers of the Babylonian school, including Rav Nachman, Hamnuna, and Sheshet, who called him a great man. His love for the Holy Land led him to decide upon leaving his native country and emigrating to Israel. This resolve, however, he kept secret from his teacher Judah, who disapproved of any emigration from Babylonia. Before leaving, he spied upon Judah while the latter was bathing, and the words which he then overheard he took with him as a valuable and instructive memento.

A favorable dream, in which he was told that his sins had been forgiven, encouraged him to undertake the journey to the Holy Land. and before starting he spent a hundred days in fasting, in order to forget the dialectic method of instruction of the Babylonian schools, that this might not handicap him in the Land of Israel. His journey took him through Akrokonia, where he met Hiyya bar Ashi, and through Sura. When he reached the River Jordan he could not control his impatience, but passed through the water without removing his clothes. When jeered at by an unbeliever who stood by, he answered, "Why should not I be impatient when I pursue a blessing which was denied even to Moses and Aaron?".

=== Arrival in the Land of Israel ===
Zeira's arrival in the Land of Israel and his first experiences there have been recorded in various anecdotes. He was small of stature and of dark complexion, for which reason Assi called him "Black Pot", according to an expression current in Babylonia; this name possibly also contained an allusion to his sputtering manner of speech. Perhaps with reference to a malformation of his legs, he was called "the little one with burned legs," or "the dark, burned one with the stubby legs". But a different explanation of this is given in Bava Metzia 85a, where it is said that he fasted in order to merit protection from the fires of Gehenna and that he then tested himself every thirty days by sitting in the fire without coming to harm, until one day the sages distracted him (cast an eye upon him) and his legs were burned. Thus, these nicknames throw light upon Zeira's ascetic piety.

In the Land of Israel he associated with all the prominent scholars. Eleazar b. Pedat was still living at the time, and from him Zeira received valuable instruction. His most intimate friends were Rabbi Assi and Hiyya bar Abba. In his interaction with Assi he was generally the one who asked questions, and on one occasion Assi made known his approval of one of Zeira's questions by saying: "Right you are, Babylonian; you have understood it correctly". Zeira especially acknowledged the authority of Ammi, the principal of the school at Tiberias, and it is related that he asked Ammi to decide questions pertaining to religious law that had been addressed to himself.

Zeira was highly esteemed by Abbahu, the rector at Caesarea, of whom he considered himself a pupil. He was ordained rabbi, a distinction usually denied to members of the Babylonian school, and though in the beginning he refused this honor, he later accepted it on learning of the atoning powers connected with the dignity. Because of the difficult route taken by Zeira to attain the rabbinate, when finally ordained, his fellow jurists humorously called out before him: "Even though she painted not her eyes with antimony, neither darkened her cheeks with rouge, nor braided her hair, yet is she still a damsel of exceptional beauty!", lines traditionally cited at weddings. Upon receiving semicha, his title changed from Rav to Rabbi.

=== Social condition and family life ===
With regard to Zeira's private vocation, the only facts known are that he once traded in linen, and that he asked Abbahu how far he might go in improving the outward appearance of his goods without rendering himself liable in the slightest degree to a charge of fraud. Information regarding his family relations is also very scanty; it is asserted that he became an orphan at an early age, and that his wedding was celebrated during Sukkot, and he had one son, Ahabah or Ahava, who has become well known through various aggadic maxims. He was known for his longevity.

On account of his lofty morals and piety Zeira was honored with the name "the pious Babylonian." Among his neighbors were several people known for their wickedness, but Zeira treated them with kindness in order to lead them to moral reformation. When he died, these people said, "Until now Zeira has prayed for us, but who will pray for us now?" This reflection so moved their hearts that they really were led to repent. That Zeira enjoyed the respect of his contemporaries is evidenced by the comment upon his death written by an elegist: "Babylonia gave him birth; Israel had the pleasure of rearing him; 'Woe is me,' says Tiberias, for she has lost her precious jewel".

== Teachings ==
Zeira occupies a prominent place in both halakhah and aggadah. In halacha, he is especially distinguished for the correctness and knowledge with which he transmits older teachings.

His aggadic sayings include the following:

- He who has never sinned is worthy of reward only if he has withstood temptation to do so.
- One should never promise a child anything which one does not intend to give it, because this would accustom the child to untruthfulness.

== See also ==
- Rabbi Zeira's stringency
