= Abba of Acre =

3rd-century rabbi and amora from Acre

Abba of Acre (Jewish Babylonian Aramaic: אבא דמן עכו, romanized: Abba d'min Akko) was an amora from Acre who flourished at the end of the 3rd century.

He was greatly respected by Rabbi Abbahu and praised as an example of modesty.
