= Shimon bar Abba =

Member of the amora of the second generation

Rabbi Shimon bar Abba was an amora of the second generation (3rd century CE).

He was a kohen, and a student-colleague of Rabbi Yochanan. He was known for his righteousness. Even though he was knowledgeable in evaluating the worth of gemstones, he never became rich, but being a kohen, he was able to sustain himself from maaser. It is said that a rich landowner named Eliposa wanted to give him maaser, but Shimon was hesitant to accept it due to uncertainty whether Eliposa was reliable in following the laws of terumot and maasrot. Only after Rabbi Yochanan testified to Eliposa's reliability did Shimon accept the maaser.

He may have been a relative or even brother of R. Hiyya bar Abba.

Tractates Shabbat (119b) and Sanhedrin (70a) mention a Babylonian sage known as Rav Amram son of Rabbi Shimon bar of Abba.
