= Shimon ben Lakish =

Jewish rabbi and amora (c. 200 – c. 275)

Shimon ben Lakish (Hebrew: שמעון בן לקיש; Imperial Aramaic: שמעון בר לקיש Shim‘on bar Lakish or bar Lakisha), better known by his nickname Reish Lakish (sometimes pronounced "Rish Lakish") (c. 200 — c. 275), was an amora who lived in the Roman province of Syria Palaestina in the third century. He was said to be born in Bosra, east of the Jordan River, around 200 CE, but lived most of his life in Sepphoris. Nothing is known of his ancestry except his father's name.

He is something of an anomaly among the important people of Torah study as, according to the Babylonian Talmud, he was in his early youth a bandit and a gladiator.

He was regarded as one of the most prominent amoraim of the second generation, the other being his brother-in-law and halakhic opponent, Johanan bar Nappaha.

== Biography ==
=== His teachers ===
According to the Talmud, Reish Lakish, like Yochanan, ascribed his knowledge of the Torah to his good fortune in having been privileged to see Judah haNasi. According to Halevy, he was a pupil of Judah II, grandson of Judah haNasi, in whose name he transmits many sayings. Bacher supposes that he was a pupil of Bar Kappara, since he often hands down sayings in his name. He appears also to have attended the academy of Hoshaiah Rabbah, whom he cites, questions, and calls the "father of the Mishnah".

=== Banditry ===
Many stories are told of Shimon's great strength and of his obesity. He was accustomed to lie on the hard ground, saying, "My fat is my cushion".

According to the Babylonian Talmud, he was supposed to have been in his early youth a bandit and a gladiator. Under the stress of unfavourable circumstances, he gave up the study of the Torah and sought to support himself by a worldly calling. He sold himself to the managers of a gladiator circus, where he could make use of his great bodily strength. He worked as a gladiator, where he fought with beasts and entertained the crowd. Another account has him seeing the beardless Johanan bar Nappaha naked and risking it all:

The Gemara relates: One day, Rabbi Yoḥanan was bathing in the Jordan River. Reish Lakish saw him and jumped into the Jordan, pursuing him. At that time, Reish Lakish was the leader of a band of marauders. Rabbi Yoḥanan said to Reish Lakish: Your strength is fit for Torah study. Reish Lakish said to him: Your beauty is fit for women. Rabbi Yoḥanan said to him: If you return to the pursuit of Torah, I will give you my sister in marriage, who is more beautiful than I am. Reish Lakish accepted upon himself to study Torah. Subsequently, Reish Lakish wanted to jump back out of the river to bring back his clothes, but he was unable to return, as he had lost his physical strength as soon as he accepted the responsibility to study Torah upon himself.

The early commentators speculated that he was a Torah scholar before his life of crime. His criminal career is strictly a Babylonian tradition, as it is not found in any of the western sources; according to the Jerusalem Talmud, Shimon spent his entire life immersed in Torah study and his criminal past is completely absent.

Johanan might be called a teacher of Reish Lakish, but Reish Lakish, through his talent and diligence, soon became equal in standing. They are designated as "the two great authorities". While Johanan was still in Sepphoris, teaching at the same time as Hanina bar Hama, Reish Lakish stood on an equality with him and enjoyed equal rights as a member of the yeshiva and council. When Johanan went to Tiberias and founded an academy there, Shimon accompanied him and took the second position in the academy.

=== His accomplishments and character traits ===
Shimon exceeded even Yochanan in acuteness, and Yochanan admitted that his right hand was missing when Shimon was not present. "When [Shimon] discussed halakhic questions, it was as if he were uprooting mountains and rubbing them together," says Ulla. Yochanan was often compelled by Shimon's logic to surrender his own opinion and accept that of Shimon, and even to act in accordance with Shimon's views. Yet it is said in praise of Shimon that all his objections to Yochanan's conclusions were founded on the Mishnah, and that with him it was not a question of showing himself to be in the right, but of securing a clear and well-established decision, and that when he could find no support for his opinion he was not ashamed to abandon it. He had a strong love of truth and an unusually courageous way of saying what he thought. He even declared to the Patriarch Judah II that fear of the latter would never induce him to keep back God's word or any opinion derived from it; and once he ventured to convey a veiled rebuke to the patriarch for avarice. Neither did he hesitate to revoke decisions of his colleagues, including Yochanan, even when action had already been taken in accordance with those decisions. On one occasion, when Yochanan presented a halakhic demonstration before Yannai, and the latter praised him for it, Shimon boldly declared, "In spite of Rabbi Yannai's great praise, R. Yochanan's opinion is not correct". He would defend his views fearlessly before the whole faculty, and sometimes he ventured to give a decision that conflicted with the Mishnah. Nevertheless, his opinions, when they differed from those of Yochanan, were not recognized as valid, except in three cases mentioned in the Babylonian Talmud.

No one equaled Shimon ben Lakish in diligence and eagerness to learn. It was his custom regularly to repeat a section from the Mishnah forty times; he boasted that even Hiyya the Great, who was renowned for his diligence, was no more diligent than he. In order to urge his pupils to continual diligence, he often quoted a proverb which he ascribed to the Torah: "If you leave me one day, I shall leave you for two". His conscientiousness and delicately balanced sense of honor are also celebrated. He avoided association with people of whose honesty he was not fully convinced; hence the testimony of any one allowed to associate with Shimon ben Lakish was accredited even in the absence of witnesses. Shimon ben Lakish was faithful to his friends, and was ever ready to render them active assistance. This is shown by the way in which, at the risk of his own life, he rescued Rabbi Assi, who had been imprisoned and was regarded as practically dead by his colleagues. Once his vigorous interference saved Yochanan's property from injury.

=== Death ===
In his aggadot Shimon frequently makes use of similes, some of which recall the days when he won a livelihood in the circus. In general, he spoke unreservedly of that time; yet an allusion to his earlier banditry wounded him so deeply that he became ill and died.

This happened as follows: Once there was a dispute over when different kinds of knives and weapons are susceptible to ritual impurity. The opinion of Shimon ben Lakish differed from that of Yochanan, whereupon Yochanan remarked, "A robber knows his own tools". Yochanan alluded to Shimon's life as a bandit, in which a knowledge of sharp weapons was a matter of course. Reish Lakish responded by supposedly denying any benefit he had received from Yochanan; "When I was a bandit they called me 'master', and now they call me 'master.'" Yochanan retorted angrily that he had brought him under the wings of the Shekhinah. The Talmud relates that due to Yochanan becoming so upset, Reish Lakish became ill and prematurely died.

Struck with guilt, Yochanan was in despair at the death of Shimon. When the academy sent Eleazar ben Pedat to act as his study partner, Yochanan accused him of being a yes-man and pined for the times when Shimon would argue back-and-forth with him to get to the correct conclusion. It is said that he kept calling, "Where is Bar Lekisha, where is Bar Lekisha?" His despondency was so great, that he is recorded as eventually losing his sanity.

According to tradition, his tomb is located in Qision, formerly a Jewish village and now a ruin situated in the Upper Galilee.

== Teachings ==
The independence which Shimon ben Lakish manifested in the discussion of halakha was equally pronounced in his treatment of aggadah. In aggadah, too, he held a prominent position, and advanced many original and independent views which struck his contemporaries with amazement and which did not win respect until later. His aggadot include exegetical and homiletical interpretations of the Scriptures; observations concerning Biblical characters and stories; sayings concerning the Commandments, prayer, the study of the Law, God, the angels, Creation mythology, Israel, and Rome, Messianic and eschatological subjects, as well as other dicta and proverbs.

His aggadic teachings include:

- "Should the sons of Israel find rest with the people among whom they are scattered, they would lose their desire to return to Israel, the land of their fathers"
- "Israel is dear to God, and He takes no pleasure in any one that utters calumnies against Israel"
- "The proselyte, however, is dearer to God than was Israel when it was gathered together at Sinai, because Israel would not have received the Law of God without the miracles of its revelation, whereas the proselyte, without seeing a single miracle, has consecrated himself to God and accepted the kingdom of heaven".
- "The words of the Torah can be remembered only by one who sacrifices himself for the sake of studying them".
- "Israel took the names of the angels from the Babylonians during the period of the Exile, because Isaiah [6:6] speaks only of 'one of the seraphim' without calling him by name; whereas Daniel names the angels Michael and Gabriel"
- "The adversary (saṭan), the evil inclination, and the angel of death, are one and the same being."
- "Job never actually existed; he is only the imaginary hero of the poem, the invention of the poet"

His aggadah is especially rich in maxims and proverbs, including:

- "No man commits a sin unless struck by momentary insanity"
- "Adorn thyself first; afterward adorn others" [i.e., lead by example]
- "Greater is he that lends than he that gives alms; but he that aids by taking part in a business undertaking is greater than either."
- "Do not live in the neighborhood of an ignorant man who is pious"
- "Who commits the sin of adultery only with the eyes is an adulterer"
- "May the judgment for a prutah be as dear to you as the judgment for a hundred [prutot]."
