= Abbahu =

Member of the third generation of Amoraim

Rabbi Abbahu
- Born: c. 279
- Died: 320
- Other name: Rabbi Abbahu of Kisrin (Caesarea Maritima)
- Occupations: Talmudist, Rector of the Caesarean academy
- Known for: Leading amora of the third generation, expertise in Greek, influential with Roman authorities

Rabbi Abbahu (Hebrew: אבהו) was a Jew and Talmudist in Caesarea Maritima from about 279 to 320 CE and is counted a member of the third generation of Amoraim. He is sometimes cited as Rabbi Abbahu of Kisrin.

== Biography ==
His rabbinical education was acquired mainly at Tiberias in the academy presided over by Johanan bar Nappaha, with whom his relationship was almost that of a son. He frequently made pilgrimages to Tiberias even after he had become well known as rector of the Caesarean academy.

Abbahu was an authority on weights and measures. He encouraged the study of Koine Greek by Jews. He learned Greek to become useful to his people, then under the Roman proconsuls, that language having become, to a considerable extent, the rival of Hebrew even in prayer. In spite of the bitter protests of Shimon bar Abba, he also taught his daughters Greek. Ecclesiastes Rabbah 7:18 says: "'It is good that you grasp this,' this is Bible, 'and from that, too, do not withdraw your hand,' this is Mishna; 'for one who fears God will fulfill them all,' like Rabbi Abbahu of Caesarea."

=== Rector in Caesarea ===
Being wise, handsome, and wealthy, Abbahu became not only popular with his coreligionists, but also influential with the proconsular government. On one occasion, when his senior colleagues, Hiyya bar Abba, Rabbi Ammi, and Rabbi Assi, had punished a certain woman, and feared the wrath of the proconsul, Abbahu was deputed to intercede for them. He had, however, anticipated the rabbis' request, and wrote to them that he had appeased the informers but not the accuser. The witty enigmatic letter describing this incident, preserved in the Jerusalem Talmud, is in Hebrew. It even includes Hebrew translations of Greek proper names to avoid the danger of possible exposure should the letter have fallen into the hands of enemies and informers.

After semikha, he declined a teacher's position, recommending Abba of Acre for the position, as he considered himself less worthy than Abba of Acre. He thereby illustrated his doctrine that it is a divine virtue to sympathise with a friend in his troubles as well as to partake of his joys. Later he assumed the office of rector in Caesarea, the former seat of the early amora Hoshaiah Rabbah. He established himself at the "Insurrectionary Synagogue" (Jewish Palestinian Aramaic: כנישתא מרדתא, romanized: kništa marratta from which some of the most prominent teachers of the next generation issued. In Caesarea. he originated several ritual rules, one of which (regulating the sounding of the shofar) has since been universally adopted, and is referred to by rishonim as "the Enactment of R. Abbahu".

He did not confine his activity to Caesarea, but also visited and taught in many other Jewish towns. On these journeys, Abbahu gathered so many halakhot that scholars turned to him for information on mooted questions. In the course of these travels he made a point of complying with all local enactments, even where such compliance laid him open to the charge of inconsistency. On the other hand, where circumstances required it, he did not spare even the noble classes. Where the rigorous exposition of laws created hardship for the am ha'aretz, he did not scruple to modify the decisions of his colleagues for the benefit of the community.

Abbahu was reportedly strict regarding halakha. According to Hullin 6a, he ordered some Samaritan wine, but subsequently heard that the Samaritans no longer strictly observed the dietary laws. With the assistance of his colleagues (Hiyya bar Abba, Rabbi Ammi, and Rabbi Assi), he investigated the report and, ascertaining it to be well-founded, ruled the Samaritans to be equivalent to Gentiles for all ritual purposes.

=== Abbahu and Hiyya bar Abba ===
Abbahu's chief characteristic seems to have been modesty. While lecturing in different towns, he met Hiyya bar Abba, who was lecturing on intricate halakhic themes. As Abbahu delivered popular sermons, the people naturally crowded to hear him and deserted the halakhist. At this apparent slight, Hiyya displayed chagrin, and Abbahu hastened to comfort him by comparing himself to the peddler of glittering fineries that always attracted the eyes of the masses. He said to Hiyya that his teachings were like jewels and Abbahu was a common peddlar in comparison; that more people bought the cheap everyday items was no sign of honor. His principle of life he expressed in the maxim, "A person should always be among those who are pursued and not among the pursuers. One can prove that this is so, as none among birds are pursued more than doves and pigeons, as all predators hunt them, and from all birds the verse deemed them fit to be sacrificed on the altar."

=== Later years ===
Abbahu had two sons, Zeira and Hanina. Some writers ascribe to him a third son, Abimi. Abbahu sent Hanina to the academy at Tiberias, where he had studied, but the youth occupied himself with the burial of the dead, and on hearing of this, the father sent him a reproachful message in this laconic style: "Is it because there are no graves in Caesarea that I have sent you off to Tiberias? Study must precede practice".

Abbahu left behind him several disciples, the most prominent among whom were the leaders of the fourth amoraic generation, Rabbi Jonah and Jose ben Halafta. The mourning was so great that it was said, "When Rabbi Abbahu passed away, the pillars of Caesarea, his city, ran with water as if they were shedding tears over him.".

== Against Sectarians ==
Abbahu, although eminent as a halakhist, was more distinguished as an aggadist and controversialist. He had many interesting disputes with sectarians of his day. Sometimes these disputes were of a humorous nature.

A certain heretic named Sason [Joy] said to Rabbi Abbahu: You are all destined to draw water for me in the World-to-Come, as it is written: “With sason you shall draw water.” Rabbi Abbahu said to him: If it had been written: For sason, it would have been as you say; now that it is written: 'With sason, it means that the skin of that man, you, will be rendered a wineskin, and we will draw water with it.'"

These controversies, although forced on him, provoked resentment, and it was even related that his physician, Jacob the Heretic, was slowly poisoning him, but Rabbi Ammi and Rabbi Assi discovered the crime in time.

And that is the background for the following exchange, as a certain heretic said to Rabbi Abbahu: When will the Messiah come? Rabbi Abbahu said to him: He will come when the darkness will enshroud these people, i.e., you. The heretic said to him: Are you cursing me for no reason? Rabbi Abbahu said to him, I am merely relating to you a verse that is written: “For behold, the darkness shall cover the earth, and fog the peoples; but the Lord shall shine upon you, and His glory shall be seen upon you” (Isaiah 60:2).

A certain heretic said to Rabbi Abbahu: Your God is a priest, as it is written: “That they take for Me an offering [teruma]” (Exodus 25:2), and teruma is given to the priests. He asked, sarcastically: When He buried Moses, in what ritual bath did He immerse? A priest who contracts impurity from a corpse must immerse in order to be able to partake of teruma. And if you would say that He immersed in water, but isn’t it written: “Who has measured the waters in the hollow of His hand” (Isaiah 40:12), that all waters of the world fit in the palm of God, so He could not immerse in them. Rabbi Abbahu said to him: He immersed in fire, as it is written: “For, behold, the Lord will come in fire” (Isaiah 66:15). The heretic said to him: But is immersion in fire effective? Rabbi Abbahu said to him: On the contrary, the main form of immersion is in fire, as it is written with regard to the removal of non-kosher substances absorbed in a vessel: “And all that abides not the fire you shall make to go through the water” (Numbers 31:23), indicating that fire purifies more than water does.

Abbahu made a notable exception about the Tosefta's statement books are not to be saved from a fire on Shabbat from a place of heathen worship, saying that he did not know the answer. Regarding the line "Blessed be the Name of His glorious Kingdom" recited after the Shema, Abbahu of Caesaria taught that in his location heretics look for points of controversy sothe words should be recited aloud lest the Jews be accused of silently tampering with the unity of God, but in the Iraqi city of Nehardea in which heretics were not present in great numbers the words are recited with a low voice.

Preaching directly against the Christian dogma, Abbahu says: "A king of flesh and blood may have a father, a brother, or a son to share in or dispute his sovereignty, but the Lord says, 'I am the Lord your God! I am the first - that is, I have no father; and I am the last - that is, I have no brother; and besides me there is no God - that is, I have no son'". His comment on Numbers 23:19 has a still more polemical tone: "God is not a man that he should lie; neither the son of man, that he should repent; if a man says: 'I am God,' he is a liar; if he says: 'I am a son of man,' he will have cause to regret it; and if he says, 'I will go up to heaven,' he has said [something] but will not keep his word".

Some of his controversies on Christian theological subjects, as on Adam, on Enoch, and on the resurrection, are less clear and direct.

== Other Abbahus ==
There are several other Abbahus mentioned in the Talmudim and Midrashim, prominent among whom is Abbahu (Abuha, Aibut) b. Ihi (Ittai), a Babylonian halakhist, contemporary of Samuel and Anan, and brother of Minyamin (Benjamin) bar Ihi. While this Abbahu repeatedly applied to Samuel for information, Samuel in return learned many halakhot from him.
