= Johanan bar Nappaha =

3rd-century Judean rabbi

- יוחנן בר נפחא
- Title: Rabbi, Amora

Personal life
- Born: 180 CE Tzipori, Galilee
- Died: 279 CE Tiberias
- Known for: Compilation of the Jerusalem Talmud

Religious life
- Religion: Judaism

Jewish leader
- Teacher: Judah ha-Nasi, Hanina bar Hama
- Period in office: 2nd century CE (second generation of Amoraim)
- Students: Abbahu, Rabbi Ammi, Rabbi Assi, Eleazar ben Pedat, Hiyya bar Abba, Jose bar Hanina, Shimon bar Abba, Rabbi Isaac Nappaha

See Johanan (name) for more rabbis by this name.

Johanan bar Nappaha (Jewish Babylonian Aramaic: יוחנן בר נפחא Yoḥanan bar Nafḥa or Napaḥa), also known as Rabbi Yochanan or Johanan bar Nafcha (180–279 CE), was a leading rabbi and second-generation Amora during the Talmudic era.

Johanan's opinions are quoted widely across the Jerusalem and Babylonian Talmuds. The compilation of the Jerusalem Talmud is generally ascribed to him.

== Name ==
He is generally cited as "Johanan", but sometimes by his cognomen only, which he himself uses once; but he is never cited by both together.

Opinions vary on whether "bar Nappaha" (literally "son [of the] blacksmith") derives from his father's profession, from the name of his ancestral region, or perhaps represents a physical or psychological quality.

== Biography ==
=== Early years ===
Johanan's early years were spent in Sepphoris in the Roman-ruled Galilee (then part of Syria Palaestina province). He traced his descent from the tribe of Joseph. His father, a blacksmith, died prior to his birth, and his mother died soon after; he was raised by his grandfather in Sepphoris.

Judah ha-Nasi took the boy under his wing and taught him Torah. Due to the disparity in ages, though—Johanan was only fifteen years old when Judah died—Johanan was not one of Judah's prime students; rather, he studied more under Judah's students. It is said that initially he sat seventeen rows behind Abba Arikha in the school taught by Judah, and could not comprehend the discussions. In later life, Johanan recalled teachings that he had gleaned from the early Sages who moved to Usha. Hanina bar Hama taught him homiletic Bible interpretation—except of the books of Proverbs and Ecclesiastes—and probably medicine, in which he became skilled.

He studied Torah diligently all his life, even selling a field house and an olive shed that he had inherited from his parents in order to be able to devote his time to study. As he expressed it, he exchanged the things that God created in six days for the things the delivery of which required forty days. After that was spent, he lived a life of poverty. For some time, he was compelled to work to support himself. But soon he felt impelled to return to his school, where he earned, not without a struggle, the encomiums of his masters. At last, owing to the universal homage paid to him, the patriarch accorded him a pension, and soon a lecturer's place was found for him.

=== Leadership ===
In Sepphoris, Johanan quickly became popular for his lectures, with crowds flocking to hear him. However, Johanan moved to Tiberias at some point before Hanina's death. The two had disagreed on two points of ritual, and Johanan, not wishing to oppose his master at his home, decided to move. It is doubtful whether they ever met again. However, Johanan maintained close relations with his other teachers to the end of their days. This was particularly the case with Hoshaiah Rabbah. He, too, moved from Sepphoris to Caesarea, where he opened a college and whither Johanan often went from Tiberias to consult him on difficult problems. Johanan continued these visits during the last 13 years of Hoshaiah's life, but they were merely social visits, Johanan no longer needing Hoshaiah's help: "He that pays his respects to his teacher is considered as one waiting on the Divine Presence".

Rabbi Johanan was sitting [and] reading in the synagogue of the Babylonians in Sepphoris. There passed in front of him a governor [with the rank of] Minister, but he (R. Johanan) did not stand up before him. They sought to have him beaten. He (the governor) said to them: 'Leave him alone. He was busy in what concerns the law (custom) of his Creator'.

In the 3rd-century CE, Johanan officiated in the synagogue of Maon and was called on to render a decision in the case of a ritual slaughterer (shochet) who had improperly slaughtered a chicken and whether or not he was to be held liable on that account. Johanan opened an academy in Tiberias, and let anybody in if they wanted to learn, a controversial move at the time. The academy soon drew large numbers of gifted students, native and foreign, among them Abbahu, Rabbi Ammi, Rabbi Assi, Eleazar ben Pedat, Hiyya bar Abba, Jose bar Hanina, Shimon bar Abba, and Rabbi Isaac Nappaha. As many of his disciples accepted and taught his decisions, and as he himself visited and lectured at other places, his fame spread far and wide. In the Diaspora, whither his teachings were carried by his students, his authority was almost as great as in his native land, and few contemporary scholars in Babylonia opposed him. Johanan himself recognized no foreign authority except that of Rav, his senior schoolmate under Judah haNasi. Johanan kept up a correspondence with Rav, and addressed him as "our master in Babylonia." After Rav's death Johanan wrote to Rav's colleague Samuel of Nehardea, but addressed him as "our colleague in Babylonia." Samuel sent him a complete calendar covering the intercalations for a period of sixty years; Johanan, however, admitted merely that Samuel was a good mathematician. But when Samuel transmitted to him a mass of disquisitions on the dietary laws, Johanan exclaimed, "I still have a master in Babylonia!" He even resolved to pay him a visit, but rumor made him believe that Samuel had in the meantime died. Johanan was long considered the greatest rabbi in the Land of Israel, and after the deaths of Rav and Samuel, the greatest authority recognized by Babylonian Jews as well. Because of the principle of halacha k'battra'i (the halachic ruling being according to the rabbi with the latest ordination from the Land of Israel in those days, felt to be uninterrupted from the direct line from the Sanhedrin), he is quoted so many times and one will notice that every 'participant' in that discussion attempts to align themselves with his opinion. In a sense, once his name is mentioned in a discussion on halachic ruling, it 'kills the discussion', as his ruling are considered final.

=== Personal details ===
Johanan is the subject of many stories. He treated his servants with great kindness: "Did not He that made me in the womb make him?" He was blessed with many children, but lost ten sons. The last one is said to have died by falling into a caldron of boiling water. The bereft father preserved a joint of the victim's little finger, which he exhibited to mourners in order to inspire resignation. "This is a bone from the body of my tenth son", he would say. However, he himself was not resigned at the death of his brother-in-law Shimon ben Lakish, his fellow amora, whom he affectionately called "my counterpart". He mourned for him long and deeply, weeping often and crying, "Bar Lakish, where art thou? O Bar Lakish! " At last he became melancholy, and for three years and a half could not attend his college; but it seems that he finally recovered his health and resumed his labors.

It is said that Johanan had an agreeable presence and a pleasing disposition; he was considered kind and considerate to the stranger as well as to his brethren; to the non-observant as to the pious; to the am ha'aretz as to the haver; for this he was beloved by his teachers and honored by all.

He is believed to have never left Israel in all his life, a rare feat for rabbis in those days, who frequently visited Babylonia.

He was known for being healthy and beautiful, and reportedly lived more than one hundred years. The Talmud relates of him: "He that wishes to see the beauty of Rabbi Johanan, let him bring a silver chalice when it comes out of the silversmith's refinery, and let him fill it with the red kernels of a pomegranate, and then let him adorn the chalice around its brim with red roses, and then place it between the sunlight and the shade. The emanating radiance would be somewhat similar to the beauty of Rabbi Johanan." He was accustomed to sit outside the mikveh in the evening, saying: "Let the daughters of Israel look at me when they come up from the mikveh and their children will be as handsome as I am and they will learn Torah like I do." He then said a special verse so no jealousy or haughtiness would result from this.

=== Death ===
On his death-bed he ordered that he should be dressed neither in white nor in black, but in scarlet, so that on awaking after death he would not feel out of place in the company either of the pious or of the wicked.

Eleazar ben Pedat succeeded Yohanan as head of the Tiberias school.

== Teaching ==
He thoroughly analyzed the Mishnah, discovering many contradictory decisions in it. He sought to reconcile these, but as that could not always be done, he perforce rejected many laws adopted in the Mishnah, preferring the authority of baraitas taught by his former masters Hiyya and Hoshaiah.

He established broad rules that apply in many cases; for example, he held that the halakha always follows a s'tam mishnah (an undisputed anonymous mishnah). He had rules for tanna ("Mishnah teacher") to follow in cases of dispute. Some such laws had been formulated by others but had proved insufficient. Johanan, therefore, elaborated and supplemented them, and most of his rules are to this day considered authoritative. All of them were collected in the geonic period in the "Order of the Tannaim and Amoraim" (סדר תנאים ואמוראים; abridged, סתו"א), which is ascribed to Nahshon ben Zadok of the ninth century.

Later Talmudists, seeing that Johanan's name appears more frequently in the Gemara than anyone else's, ascribed to him the compilation of the Jerusalem Talmud. Modern scholars believe that he began the compilation, which was not completed until over a century after him.

In his religious decisions, Johanan was comparatively liberal. He blamed the destruction of the Temple by the Romans on the strictness of rabbis when applying religious verdicts. He sided with Judah II in the repeal of the prohibition against using oil made by pagans. He permitted Greek to be studied by men (because it enabled them to defend themselves against informers) and by women (because familiarity with Greek was considered attractive in women). He allowed the painting of decorative figures on the walls. Under certain circumstances, he permitted emigration from Eretz Yisrael: "If you are mentioned [nominated by the Romans] for office, make the Jordan your boundary friend [escape over the Jordan], even on a semiholiday".

He was one of the most prolific aggadists. Midrash Tehillim has, erroneously, been ascribed to him.

== Attribution ==
It has the following bibliography:

- Bacher, Ag. Pal. Amor. i. 205-339;
- Frankel, Mebo, pp. 95b-97b;
- Grätz, Gesch. 2d ed., iv. 257 et seq.;
- Halevy, Dorot ha-Rishonim, ii. 149b et seq.;
- Hamburger, R. B. T.;
- Heilprin, Seder ha-Dorot, ii.;
- Isaak Markus Jost: Geschichte des Judenthums und seiner Sekten, Leipzig, Dörffling und Franke, 1857, ii. 149, passim;
- Weiss, Dor, iii. 69 et seq.
