= Eleazar ben Pedat =

3rd-century Jewish scholar from Babylon

Eleazar ben Pedat (Hebrew: רבי אלעזר בן פדת) was a second and third-generation amora or Talmudist from Babylon who lived in Syria Palaestina during the 3rd century.

He became a scholar at the Talmudic academy at Tiberias, where he was held in great esteem and served as head master, becoming known as "master [i.e., legal authority] of the land of Israel".

== Early life and study ==
He was a Babylonian by birth and of priestly descent. In his native country he was a disciple of Samuel, and more especially of Rav, whom he in after years generally cited by the appellation "our teacher", and whose academy he revered above all others, recognizing in it the "lesser sanctuary" of the Diaspora, as promised (Ezekiel 11:16) to the exiles in Babylonia.

When and why he left Babylonia is not stated; but from the data extant it appears that his ardent love for the Land of Israel, and the superior opportunities which Palestine afforded for religious practices, impelled him to emigrate to there—and at a comparatively early age, since some of Rabbi's contemporaries were still alive and active. Indeed, it seems that for a time Eleazar even attended the lectures of Hiyya the Great and of Hoshaiah Rabbah. This was for him a period of hard study, which gave rise to the homiletic remark that the Biblical saying, "Be thou ravished always with her love," was well illustrated by Eleazar ben Pedat at Sepphoris, who was so absorbed in his studies as to be unconscious of all worldly needs.

== Scholarly career ==
Later, Eleazar became attached to the Talmudic academy founded by R. Johanan at Tiberias, where his scholarship procured him great honors. In Tiberias he was associated with Simon b. Eliakim in the office of judge, and at the academy he occupied the position of colleague-disciple (חבר ותלמיד) of Johanan, who himself repeatedly admitted that Eleazar had enlightened him, once declaring that "the son of Pedat sits and interprets the Law as did Moses at the direct inspiration from the Almighty". After the death of Shimon ben Lakish, Eleazar was chosen to fill the position of assistant to Johanan. When Johanan became disabled through grief at Shimon's death, Eleazar presided over the academy, and after the death of Johanan succeeded him in the office of head master.

Eleazar's fame as an expert expounder of the Law having reached Babylonia, his most prominent contemporaries there addressed to him intricate halakhic questions, to which he returned satisfactory answers. This happened so often that he became known in his native country as the "master [i.e., legal authority] of the land of Israel"; and anonymous decisions introduced in the Babylonian schools with the statement "They sent word from there" were understood, as a matter of course, to emanate from Eleazar ben Pedat.

There are no data to show how long Eleazar survived R. Johanan, but he probably died about 279 C.E.

== His views ==
=== On study ===
Eleazar was averse to the study of esoteric matters. With reference to this study, he would cite the saying of Ben Sira, "Seek not things that are too hard for you, and search not out things that are above your strength". He prized knowledge above all things; therefore he remarked," He who possesses knowledge is as great as if the Temple were rebuilt in his days"; and from Job 20:21 he teaches that he who does not contribute toward the support of scholars will not be blessed in his property.

=== On charity ===
He frequently sang the praises of charity. "The practice of charity," he was wont to say, "is more meritorious than all oblations; as the Bible says, 'To do justice [Hebr. צדקה] and judgment is more acceptable to the Lord than sacrifice'. He who practices charity secretly is greater [in the sight of God] than Moses himself; for Moses himself admitted 'I was afraid of the anger,' while of secret charity the Bible says, 'A gift in secret pacifies anger'". Benevolence and acts of loving-kindness (גמילות חסדים) are, according to Eleazar's interpretation, even greater than charity; as the Bible says, "Sow to yourselves in righteousness [Hebr. צדקה], reap in mercy [חסד]." With reference to צדקה, the Bible uses "sowing," indicating an operation that leaves it in doubt whether the sower will or will not enjoy the fruit; while with reference to mercy "reaping" is used, an occupation that renders the enjoying of the results very probable. From the same Scriptural expression Eleazar draws the lesson, "Charity is rewarded only in proportion to the kindness in it"; that is, the pleasant and thoughtful way in which it is given, and the personal sacrifice it involves.

Eleazar was exceedingly poor, and often lacked the necessaries of life. Nevertheless, he would never accept any gifts, or even invitations to the patriarch's table. When any were extended to him, he would decline them with the remark, "It seems that you do not wish me to live long, since the Bible says, 'He that hates gifts shall live'". His scant earnings he would share with other needy scholars; thus, he once purposely lost a coin in order that poverty-stricken Shimon bar Abba, who was following him, might find it. When the latter did find it and offered to restore it, Eleazar assured him that he had renounced its ownership and forfeited all rights thereto, and that consequently it was the property of the finder. It is also reported as his custom first to offer a prutah to the poor, and then to offer prayer to God. Even to impostors he would never refuse charity. "Were it not for the existence of impostors, not a single refusal of charity could ever be atoned for; we therefore ought to show gratitude to them".

== Bibliography ==
with the following bibliography:

- Bacher, Ag. Pal. Amor. ii. 1 et seq.;
- Frankel, Mebo, p. 111b et seq.; Breslau, 1870;
- Heilprin, Seder ha-Dorot, ii., s.v.; Warsaw, 1882.
- Weiss, Dor, iii. 85 et seq.;
- Zacuto, Yuasin, ed. Filipowski, pp. 113a et seq.
