= Rabbi Ammi =

Name of several ancient Jewish scholars

Rabbi Ammi, Aimi, Immi (Hebrew: רבי אמי) is the name of several Jewish Talmudists, known as amoraim, who lived in the Land of Israel and Babylonia. In the Babylonian Talmud the first form only is used; in the Jerusalem Talmud all three forms appear, Immi predominating, and sometimes R. Ammi is contracted into "Rabmi" or "Rabbammi".

The most distinguished "Ammi" is an amora of the third generation (3rd century), whose full name was Ammi ben Nathan, who immediately took over Rabbi Johanan bar Nappaha's position after his decease in 279 CE.

== Biography ==
His native country is not named, but it is generally assumed to be Babylonia. It seems probable that the lifelong friendship existing between R. Ammi and R. Assi had its origin in ties of blood. R. Assi is identical with R. Assi (Jose) b. Nathan, and R. Ammi's full name, as given by himself, is Ammi ben Nathan; both of them, moreover, were of priestly descent; so that they seem to have been the sons of the same father. As R. Assi was a native Babylonian, there is reason for assuming R. Ammi's Babylonian origin.

In his youth, Ammi attended the college at Caesarea, presided over by R. Hoshaiah Rabbah. Later he went to Tiberias and became the disciple of R. Johanan, at whose death he voluntarily observed the ritual period of mourning prescribed on the death of nearest relatives only. When he once heard that his Babylonian contemporary, Rav Nachman, had expressed himself disrespectfully of a misapplied opinion of R. Johanan, he indignantly exclaimed, "Does Nahman think that because he is the son-in-law of the exilarch, he may speak disparagingly of R. Johanan's opinions?" In Tiberias he became the center of a large circle of learned friends, among whom were R. Abbahu, R. Ḥanina (Ḥinena) b. Pappi, R. Isaac, and R. Samuel ben Nahmani, but the closest and most enduring friendship existed between him and R. Hiyya bar Abba and R. Assi, both of whom were Babylonian immigrants.

=== As judge ===
Although R. Ammi had been in The Land of Israel long before R. Assi, they were both ordained at the same time, and received a warm greeting from the students, who sang, "Such men, such men ordain for us! Ordain for us not those who use words like 'sermis' and 'sermit,' or 'hemis' and 'tremis'", which was an allusion to the simple language used by these rabbis as contrasted with the admixtures of foreign terms employed by other teachers. These two, together with R. Hiyya bar Abba, constituted a court of justice - whose administration at one time endangered their liberty, if not their lives. For a certain offense they had passed a severe sentence on a woman named Tamar, whereupon she preferred charges against them before the proconsular government for interfering with the Roman courts. Fearing the consequences of this denunciation they requested R. Abbahu to exert his influence with the government in their behalf, but he had anticipated the request, and nothing more was heard of the case.

Among their Babylonian contemporaries, Ammi and Assi were known as "the judges of the Land of Israel," or as "the distinguished priests of The Land of Israel". On the other hand, when R. Ammi quoted a doctrine of Rav or of Samuel, he introduced it with the expression, "Our masters in Babylonia say".

=== Rector at Tiberias ===
Eventually R. Ammi succeeded to the rectorate of the academy at Tiberias, but that did not prevent him from attending to his judicial functions, in conjunction with Rabbi Assi. Indeed, it is reported that they interrupted their studies hourly, and, rapping at the academy door, announced their readiness to hear causes if required. They would offer their prayers in the academy building, preferring for that purpose the spaces between the pillars to all the thirteen synagogues in the city. Besides filling these offices, they, together with R. Hiyya, acted as inspectors and, where necessary, as organizers of schools for children and for adults. One of the instructions given by Ammi to the schoolmasters was to accommodate itinerant scholars in the schoolrooms. In connection with one of the tours of inspection, the following characteristic anecdote is related:

They came to a place where there were neither primary schools for children nor advanced schools for adults, and requested that the guardians of the city be summoned. When the councilmen appeared before them, the rabbis exclaimed, "Are these the guardians of the city? They are the destroyers of the city!" When asked who were the guardians, they replied, "The instructors of the young and the masters of the old; for thus the Scripture says, 'Unless the Lord guards the city, the watchman is awake in vain'."

Besides their familiarity with halakhah and aggadah, Ammi and Assi also possessed some knowledge of the sciences of their time. They prescribed remedies in cases of sickness, and studied the habits of animals. Much as they valued the study of the Law, they prized pious deeds still higher. Therefore they and R. Hiyya bar Abba did not hesitate to absent themselves from academy and to miss a lecture by R. Eleazar, when the burial of a stranger required their attention; and when once a considerable sum of money was presented to the academy, Ammi took possession of it in the name of the poor, among whom it was subsequently distributed. Once R. Ammi, accompanied by R. Samuel ben Nahmani, undertook a journey to the court of Zenobia (queen of Palmyra) to intercede for Zeir b. Ḥinena, who had been seized by her orders. Zenobia refused to liberate him, remarking, "Your God is accustomed to work miracles for you," when a Saracen, bearing a sword, entered and reported, "With this sword has Bar Nazar killed his brother"; this incident saved Zeir b. Ḥinena. On another occasion he was ready to ransom a man who had repeatedly sold himself to the Ludi (lanistæ, procurers of subjects for gladiatorial contests) He argued that although the Mishnah exempted a Jew from the duty of ransoming a man who repeatedly sells himself to non-Israelites, still it was his duty to ransom the children (to save them from sinking into idolatry); so much the greater was this obligation in a case where violent death was imminent. Ammi's colleagues, however, convinced him that the applicant for his protection was totally unworthy of his compassion, and he finally refused to interfere.

== Teachings ==
R. Ammi and R. Assi are very frequently cited in both Talmuds and in the Midrashim, and often together, either as being of the same opinion or as opposed to each other. Owing to this circumstance, the same doctrines are quoted sometimes in the name of one and sometimes in that of the other. The same uncertainty manifests itself even where the reporter had probably received the tradition directly from one of them.

Following are some examples of R. Ammi's exegetics:

- Commenting on Lamentations 3:41, "Let us lift up our heart with our hands to God in the heavens," he observes, "No man's prayer is heard of heaven, unless he carry his soul in the hands which he raises in prayer."
- "The prayer for rain is granted only for the sake of the men of faith." In support of this remark, Ammi, by means of an exegetical substitution of synonymous Hebrew words, quotes Psalms 85:11 ("When Faith springs forth from the earth, Beneficence looks down from heaven").
- In Moses' designation of Israel as "a stiff-necked people", Ammi sees not so much a reproach as a praise of its firmness in religion, even in the face of persecution: "The Jew would either live as a Jew or die on the cross".
- According to R. Ammi, death is the consequence of sin, and suffering the penalty of wrongdoing; the first observation he derives from Ezekiel 18:4 ("The soul that sins, it shall die"); the second from Psalms 89:33 ("I will visit their transgressions with the rod [of punishment], and their iniquity with stripes").

=== Other quotes ===
- Whoever fails to use reason cannot expect men to pity him (i.e. when he falls into trouble).
