= Rabbi Assi =

Jewish Talmudist and rabbi

Assi II (Assa, Issi, Jesa, Josah, Jose, Hebrew: רבי אסי) was a Jewish Talmudist of the 3rd and 4th centuries (third generation of amoraim) who lived in the Land of Israel. He is known by the name of Yessa in the Jerusalem Talmud.

He should not be confused with Rav Assi, who belonged to first generation of amoraim in Babylonia.

== Biography ==
He was one of the two Palestinian scholars known among their contemporary Jewish Talmudical scholars of Babylonian as "the judges of the Land of Israel" and as "the distinguished priests of the Land of Israel," the other being R. Ammi. Assi was born in Babylonia, where he attended the college of Samuel of Nehardea, but later emigrated in consequence of domestic trouble.

On his arrival in Tiberias, Assi had an adventure with a ruffian, which ended disastrously for the latter. Assi was making his way toward the baths, when he was assaulted by a "scorner." He did not resent the assault, except by remarking, "That man's neck-band is too loose," and continued on his way. It so happened that an archon was at that very hour trying a thief, and the scoffer, still laughing at the adventure with Assi, came to witness the trial just when the judge interrogated the culprit as to accomplices. The culprit, seeing the man laughing, thought that it was at his discomfiture, and to avenge himself pointed to the ruffian as his accomplice. The man was apprehended and examined. He confessed to a murder he had committed, and was sentenced to be hanged with the convicted thief. Assi, on returning from the baths, encountered the procession on its way to the execution. His assailant on seeing him exclaimed, "The neck-band which was loose will soon be tightened", to which Assi replied, "Your fate has long since been foretold, for the Bible says, 'Be you not scorners, lest your bands be made strong'."

Assi's professional career in the Land of Israel was closely intertwined with that of R. Ammi. R. Assi was very methodical in his lectures, making no digressions to answer questions not germane to the subject under discussion; and whenever such were propounded to him, he put off reply until he reached the subject to which they related.

Assi became a disciple of R. Johanan, and so distinguished himself that R. Eleazar called him "the prodigy of the age" ("mofet ha-dor"), and legend pictures him accordingly. Concerning the futile longings of many to communicate with the departed spirit of R. Hiyya the Great, legend relates that R. Jose fasted eighty days in order that a glimpse of R. Hiyya might be granted him. Finally Hiyya's spirit appeared, but the sight so affected R. Jose that his hands became palsied and his eyes dim. "Nor must you infer from this," the narrator continues, "that R. Josah was an unimportant individual. Once a weaver came to R. Johanan and said, 'In a dream I have seen the skies fall, but one of your disciples held them up.' When asked whether he knew that disciple, the weaver replied that he would be able to recognize him. R. Johanan thereupon had all his disciples pass before the weaver, who pointed to R. Josah as the miraculous agent." Another adventure, which, however, bears the impress of fact, is related of him, wherein he was once abducted in a riot and given up as lost, but R. Shimon ben Lakish, the former gladiator, rescued him at the risk of his own life.

== Wisdom and death ==
R. Assi is frequently quoted in both Talmudim and in the Midrashim. Profound is his observation:

At first the evil inclination is like a shuttle-thread (or spider-web), but eventually it grows to be like a cart rope, as is said in the Scriptures, "Woe unto them who draw iniquity with cords of vanity, and sin as if it were with a cart rope".

An anecdote characteristic of rabbinical sympathy for inferiors and domestics is thus related: The wife of R. Jose had a quarrel with her maid, and her husband declared her in the wrong; whereupon she said to him, "Why did you declare me wrong in the presence of my maid?" To which the rabbi replied, "Did not Job say, 'If I did despise the cause of my manservant or of my maidservant, when they contended with me, what then shall I do when God rises up? And when He visits, what shall I answer Him?'" When Assi died, R. Hiyya bar Abba, who had been his associate as judge and as teacher, went into mourning as for a relative. The day of his death is recorded as coincident with a destructive hurricane.

It is possible that R. Assi, before his emigration to Palestine, was known as Assi (Issi, Jose) b. Nathan, the one that is met with in an halakhic controversy with Ulla (b. Ishmael) propounding a ritual question to Hiyya bar Ashi, and seeking an interpretation of a Baraita from the mouth of Rab Sheshet.
