= Zerika =

Amora scholar of the 4th generation

Rabbi Zerika (Hebrew: רבי זריקא) was an Amora of the Land of Israel of the fourth generation of the Amoraic era.

== Biography ==
He studied under R. Abbahu along with his colleague R. Yirmeyah. He was the student of Rabbi Ammi (his principle teacher), R. Shimon ben Lakish, R. Eleazar ben Pedat, and R. Judah ben Ezekiel. He used to copy Baraitas and arrange them. He also cites Rav Huna's maxims. His colleague was Rav Zeira. He was a colleague of Abba, with whom he decided the controversy of Judah ha-Nasi and Nathan on the problem whether the night should be divided into three or four watches, and by whom he was informed of a correction in a halakhic tradition given by Rabbi Ammi.

In Babylonia, it was said that he had called Rav Safra's attention to the difference between the modesty of "pious Palestine" and the audacity of "bold Babylonia" on the occasion of the prayer for rain.

No aggadic teachings of Zerika's have been preserved, the only saying ascribed to him actually belonging to Ḥidka, whose name was incorrectly transliterated "Zerika".
