= Aha bar Jacob =

Babylonian Amora

Rav Aha bar Jacob (or R. Aha bar Ya'akov; Hebrew: רבי אחא בר יעקב) was a Babylonian rabbi of the third and fourth generations of Amoraim.

He was one of the disciples of Rav Huna. He was also one of the prominent Jewish leaders of Papunia. In the Talmud it is said that he was a man of great piety and a great scholar.
