= Rabbi Bana'ah =

R. Bana'ah (Hebrew: בנאה; or R. Benaiah, Hebrew: בניה, both derived from the word בניה, Benaia ('bniya'), lit. construction or building; was a rabbi who lived in the early 3rd century, during the intermediate period between the Tannaim and the Amoraim.

== Biography ==
His description of the speech in his place of origin suggests he may have come from outside the Land of Israel.

Bannaah apparently lived in Tiberias, and his pupils included Johanan ben Nappaha.

The following story is told: "Bannaah was in the habit of marking tombs, in order that persons might guard themselves against ritual impurity. Once he arrived at the Cave of the Patriarchs. At the entrance he found Eliezer (Abraham's servant) and, being announced by him, then entered. When Bannaah endeavored to view the grave of Adam, which was situated in the same cave, a voice came from heaven, saying: 'You may look upon the image of My image [Jacob], but not upon My direct image [Adam].' But Bannaah had already seen the soles of Adam's feet, which were similar to two suns."

== Teachings ==
Not much of a halakhic nature from him has been preserved; but he is distinguished as one of the great aggadists of his time.

=== Halacha ===
Regarding Bannaah's relation to Judah haNasi, the following utterance is characteristic: "Man should ever penetrate deep into the study of the Mishnah; for if he knock it will be opened to him, be it the Talmud [= halakhah] or the aggadah". Bannaah therefore belongs to the few of the semi-tannaim who fully acknowledged the value in Judah's collection of the Mishnah, regarding it as a progressive step in the development of the tannaitic literature.

He was willing to decide court cases by estimate without tangible proof. In a story similar to the Judgment of Solomon, it is recorded that he was called to decide on the inheritance of a man who died with one legitimate and nine mamzer sons. The father had left a will granting all his possessions "to one son" without specifying which. Banaah told the sons to go and beat the father's grave until the father returned to life and told them who was intended. One son refused to do this, and Banaah rewarded the inheritance to him. The remaining sons complained to the Byzantine government, which imprisoned Banaah, until his wife managed to get him freed.

He ruled that while owners of a shared courtyard could prevent each other from using the courtyard for various purposes, they could not prevent female owners from doing laundry there, as it was considered disrespectable for Jewish women to have to do laundry in public.

He insisted on rabbis dressing formally; his student Rabbi Yochanan, too, seems to have adopted this practice.

=== Aggadah ===
He said that the Biblical Joshua acted "in accordance with the spirit of the Law as revealed by God to Moses, also in instances when not directly instructed by the latter", which may also reflect his attitude towards halacha in general.

His view on the origin of the Pentateuch is remarkable as almost bordering on Biblical criticism. "The Torah was given in rolls", i.e. separate sections, which were afterward joined into a unity.

In aggadic exegesis, Bannaah frequently applies symbolism. For instance, he thinks that God demanded gold for the Tabernacle, in order that Israel might in this way do penance for the sin committed in worshiping the golden calf. The following words of Bannaah are also noteworthy: "Saul began to subtilize over the order which he had received to exterminate Amalek. 'If the men have sinned,' said he, 'in what manner have the women, the children, or the cattle?' Whereupon there came a voice from heaven that cried, 'Be not righteous overmuch', that is, 'Be not more just than thy Creator'".

=== Quotes ===
- Whoever occupies himself with the Torah for its own sake - his learning becomes an elixir of life to him, for it is said, 'It is a tree of life to those who grasp it'; and it is further said, 'It shall be as health to your navel'; and it is also said, 'For whoever finds me, finds life'. But, whoever occupies himself with the Torah not for its own sake - it becomes to him a deadly poison, as it is said, 'My doctrine shall drop [ya'arof] as the rain', and ‘arifa‘ surely means death, as it is said, 'And they shall break [ve'arfu] the heifer's neck there in the valley'."
