= Ki Tissa =

9th Torah portion in Book of Exodus

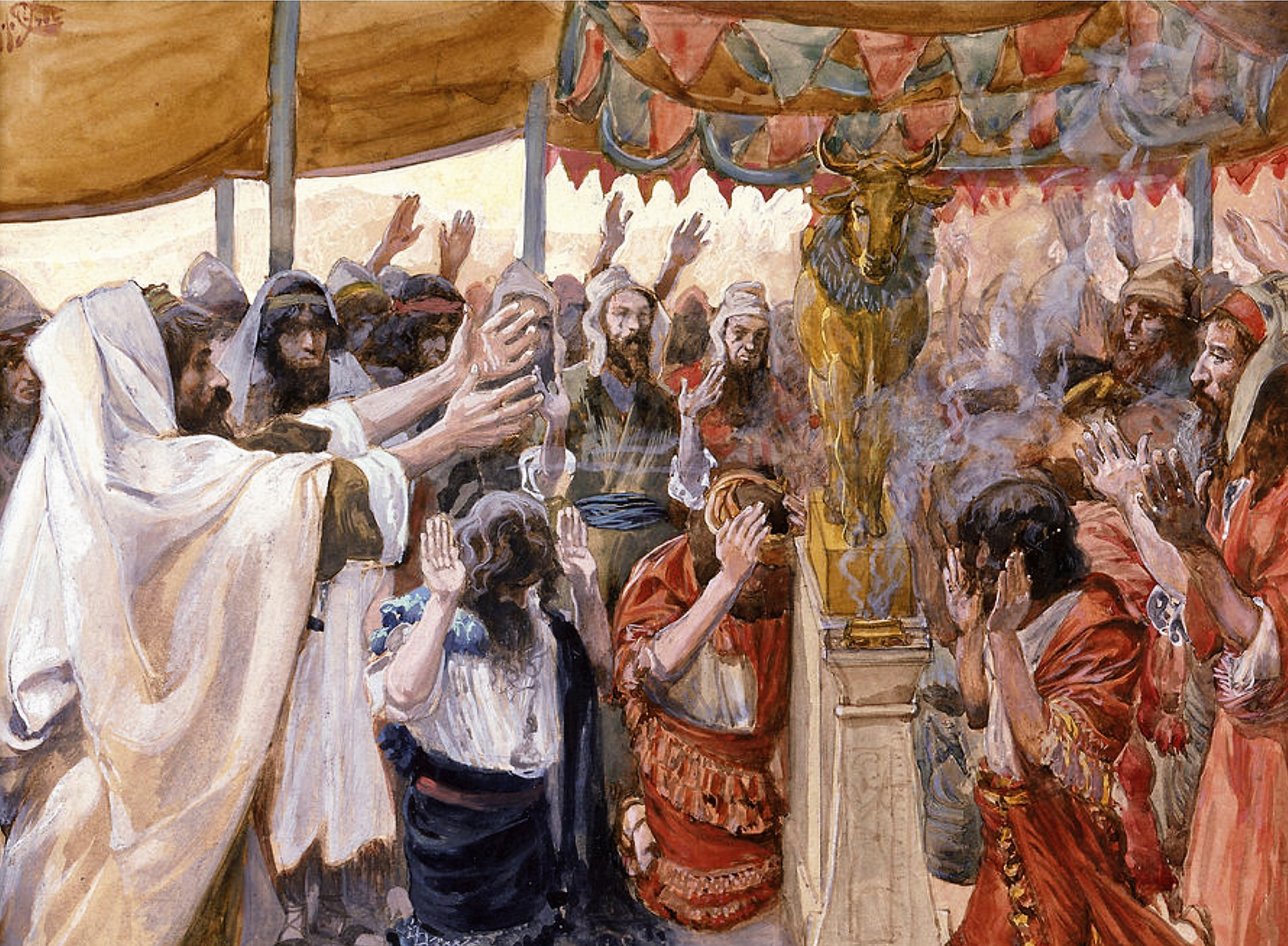
The Golden Calf (gouache on board, c. 1896–1902 by James Tissot)

Ki Tissa or Ki Siso (כִּי תִשָּׂא ki tissā 'when you take', the sixth and seventh words, and incipit) is the 21st weekly Torah portion in the annual cycle of Torah reading in Rabbinic Judaism and the ninth in the Book of Exodus. The parashah recounts the building of the Tabernacle, the incident of the golden calf, Moses' request that God reveal God's Attributes, and how Moses became radiant.

The parashah constitutes Exodus 30:11–34:35. The parashah is the longest of the weekly Torah portions in the book of Exodus (although not the longest in the Torah, which is Naso), and is made up of 7424 Hebrew letters, 2002 Hebrew words, 139 verses, and 245 lines in a Torah scroll.

Jews read it on the 21st Shabbat after Simchat Torah, in the Hebrew month of Adar, corresponding to February or March in the secular calendar. Jews also read the first part of the parashah, Exodus 30:11–16, regarding the half-shekel head tax, as the maftir Torah reading on the special Sabbath, Shabbat Shekalim. Jews also read parts of the parashah addressing the intercession of Moses and God's mercy, Exodus 32:11–14 and 34:1–10, as the Torah readings on the fast days of the Tenth of Tevet, the Fast of Esther, the Seventeenth of Tammuz, and the Fast of Gedalia, and for the afternoon (Mincha) prayer service on Tisha B'Av. Jews read another part of the parashah, Exodus 34:1–26, which addresses the Three Pilgrim Festivals, as the initial Torah reading on the third intermediate day (Chol HaMoed) of Passover. And Jews read a larger selection from the same part of the parashah, Exodus 33:12–34:26, as the initial Torah reading on a Sabbath that falls on one of the intermediate days of Passover or Sukkot.

== Readings ==
In traditional Sabbath Torah reading, the parashah is divided into seven readings (עליות, aliyot). In the Masoretic Text of the Tanakh (Hebrew Bible), Parashat Ki Tisa has ten "open portion" (פתוחה, petuchah) divisions (roughly equivalent to paragraphs, often abbreviated with the Hebrew letter (פ (peh)). Parashat Ki Tisa has several further subdivisions, called "closed portion" (סתומה, setumah) divisions (abbreviated with the Hebrew letter (ס (samekh)) within the open portion divisions. The first three open portion divisions divide the long first reading (aliyah), and the next three open portion divisions divide the long second reading. The seventh open portion corresponds to the short third reading, and the eighth open portion corresponds to the short fourth reading. The ninth open portion spans the fifth and sixth readings. And the tenth open portion begins in the seventh reading. Closed portion divisions further divide the first and second readings, and conclude the seventh reading.

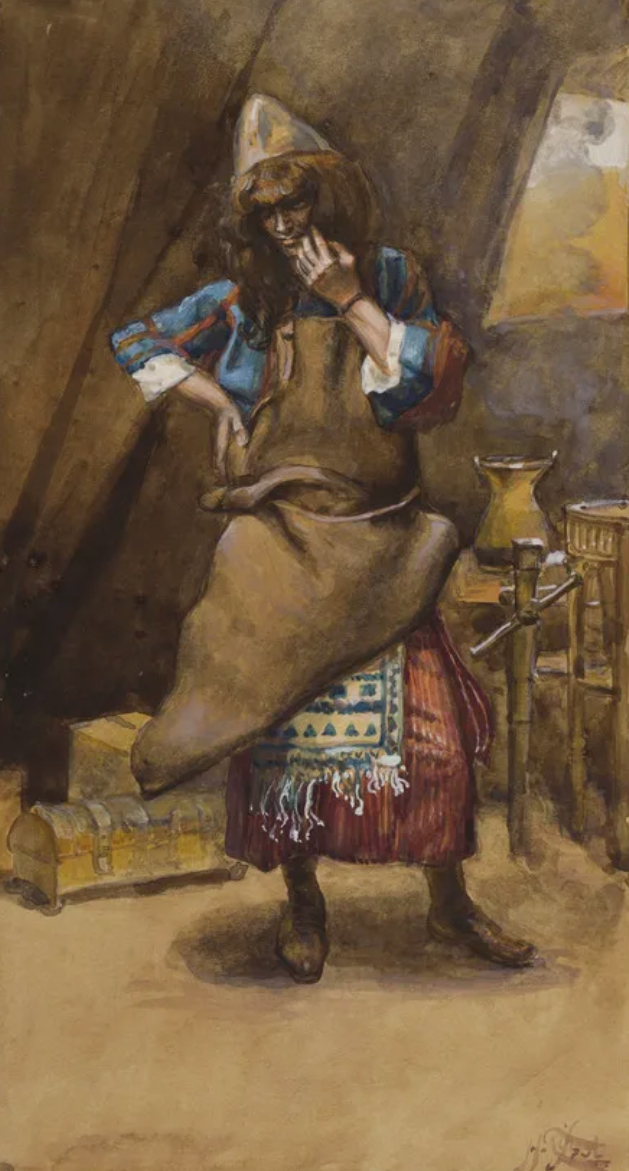
The Goldsmith (gouache on board, c. 1896–1902 by James Tissot)

=== First reading—Exodus 30:11–31:17 ===
In the long first reading, God instructed Moses that when he took a census of the Israelites, each person 20 years old or older, regardless of wealth, should give a half-shekel offering. God told Moses to assign the proceeds to the service of the Tent of Meeting. The first open portion ends here.

In the continuation of the reading, God told Moses to place a copper laver (כִּיּוֹר, kiyor) between the Tent of Meeting and the altar (מִּזְבֵּחַ, mizbeiach), so that Aaron and the priests could wash their hands and feet in water when they entered the Tent of Meeting or approached the altar to burn a sacrifice, so that they would not die. The second open portion ends here.

In the continuation of the reading, God directed Moses to make a sacred anointing oil from choice spices—myrrh, cinnamon, cassia—and olive oil. God told Moses to use it to anoint the Tent of Meeting, the furnishings of the Tabernacle, and the priests. God told Moses to warn the Israelites not to copy the sacred anointing oil's recipe for lay purposes, at pain of exile. A closed portion ends here.

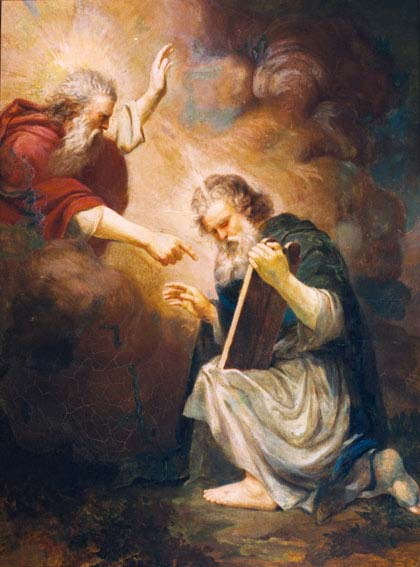
Moses Receives the Tablets of the Law (1868 painting by João Zeferino da Costa)

In the continuation of the reading, God directed Moses make sacred incense from herbs—stacte, onycha, galbanum, and frankincense—to burn in the Tent of Meeting. As with the anointing oil, God warned against making incense from the same recipe for lay purposes. Another closed portion ends here with the end of chapter 30.

As the reading continues in chapter 31, God informed Moses that God had endowed Bezalel of the Tribe of Judah with divine skill in every kind of craft. God assigned to him Oholiab of the Tribe of Dan and granted skill to all who are skillful, that they might make the furnishings of the Tabernacle, the priests' vestments, the anointing oil, and the incense. The third open portion ends here.

In the continuation of the reading, God told Moses to admonish the Israelites nevertheless to keep the Sabbath, on pain of death. The first reading and a closed portion end here.

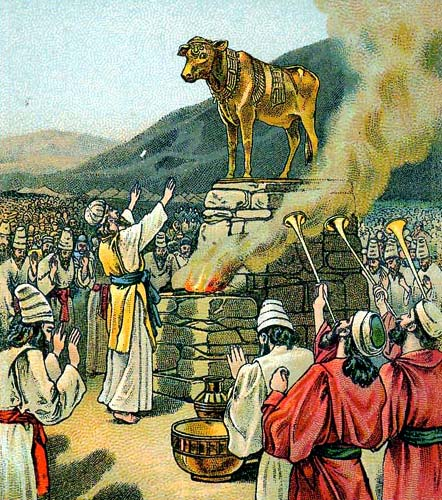
Worshiping the Golden Calf (illustration from a Bible card published 1901 by the Providence Lithograph Company)

=== Second reading—Exodus 31:18–33:11 ===
In the long second reading, God gave Moses two stone tablets inscribed by the finger of God. Meanwhile, the people became impatient for the return of Moses, and implored Aaron to make them a god. Aaron told them to bring him their gold earrings, and he cast them in a mold and made a molten golden calf. They exclaimed, "This is your god, O Israel, who brought you out of the land of Egypt!" Aaron built an altar before the calf, and announced a festival of the Lord. The people offered sacrifices, ate, drank, and danced. The fourth open portion ends here.

In the continuation of the reading, God told Moses what the people had done, saying "let Me be, that My anger may blaze forth against them and that I may destroy them, and make of you a great nation." But Moses implored God not to do so, lest the Egyptians say that God delivered the people only to kill them off in the mountains. Moses called on God to remember Abraham, Isaac, and Jacob, and God's oath to make their offspring as numerous as the stars, and God renounced the planned punishment. The fifth open portion ends here.

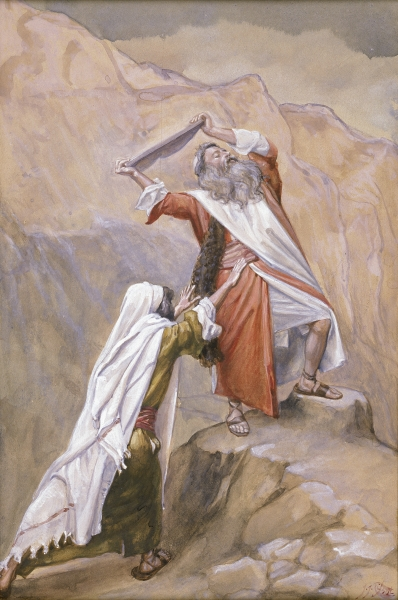
Moses Destroys the Tables of the Ten Commandments (gouache on board, c. 1896–1902 by James Tissot)

In the continuation of the reading, Moses descended the mountain bearing the two tablets. Joshua told Moses, "There is a cry of war in the camp," but Moses answered, "It is the sound of song that I hear!" When Moses saw the calf and the dancing, he became enraged and shattered the tablets at the foot of the mountain. He burned the calf, ground it to powder, strewed it upon the water, and made the Israelites drink it. When Moses asked Aaron how he committed such a great sin, Aaron replied that the people asked him to make a god, so he hurled their gold into the fire, "and out came this calf!" Seeing that Aaron had let the people get out of control, Moses stood in the camp gate and called, "Whoever is for the Lord, come here!" All the Levites rallied to Moses, and at his instruction killed 3,000 people, including brother, neighbor, and kin. Moses went back to God and asked for God either to forgive the Israelites or kill Moses too, but God insisted on punishing only the sinners, which God did by means of a plague. A closed portion ends here with the end of chapter 32.

As the reading continues in chapter 33, God dispatched Moses and the people to the Promised Land, but God decided not to go in their midst, for fear of destroying them on the way. Upon hearing this, the Israelites went into mourning. Moses would pitch the Tent of Meeting outside the camp, and Moses would enter to speak to God, face to face, as a man speaks with his friend. The second reading and the sixth open portion end here.

=== Third reading—Exodus 33:12–16 ===
In the short third reading, Moses asked God whom God would send with Moses to lead the people. Moses further asked God to let him know God's ways, that Moses might know God and continue in God's favor. And God agreed to lead the Israelites. Moses asked God not to make the Israelites move unless God were to go in the lead. The third reading and the seventh open portion end here.

=== Fourth reading—Exodus 33:17–23 ===
In the short fourth reading, God agreed to lead them. Moses asked God to let him behold God's Presence. God agreed to make all God's goodness pass before Moses and to proclaim God's name and nature, but God explained that no human could see God's face and live. God instructed Moses to station himself on a rock, where God would cover him with God's hand until God had passed, at which point Moses could see God's back. The fourth reading and the eighth open portion end here with the end of chapter 33.

=== Fifth reading—Exodus 34:1–9 ===
In the fifth reading, in chapter 34, God directed Moses to carve two stone tablets like the ones that Moses shattered, so that God might inscribe upon them the words that were on the first tablets, and Moses did so. God came down in a cloud and proclaimed: "The Lord! The Lord! A God compassionate and gracious, slow to anger, abounding in kindness and faithfulness, extending kindness to the thousandth generation, forgiving iniquity, transgression, and sin; yet He does not remit all punishment, but visits the iniquity of parents upon children and children's children, upon the third and fourth generations." Moses bowed low and asked God to accompany the people in their midst, to pardon the people's iniquity, and to take them for God's own. The fifth reading ends here.

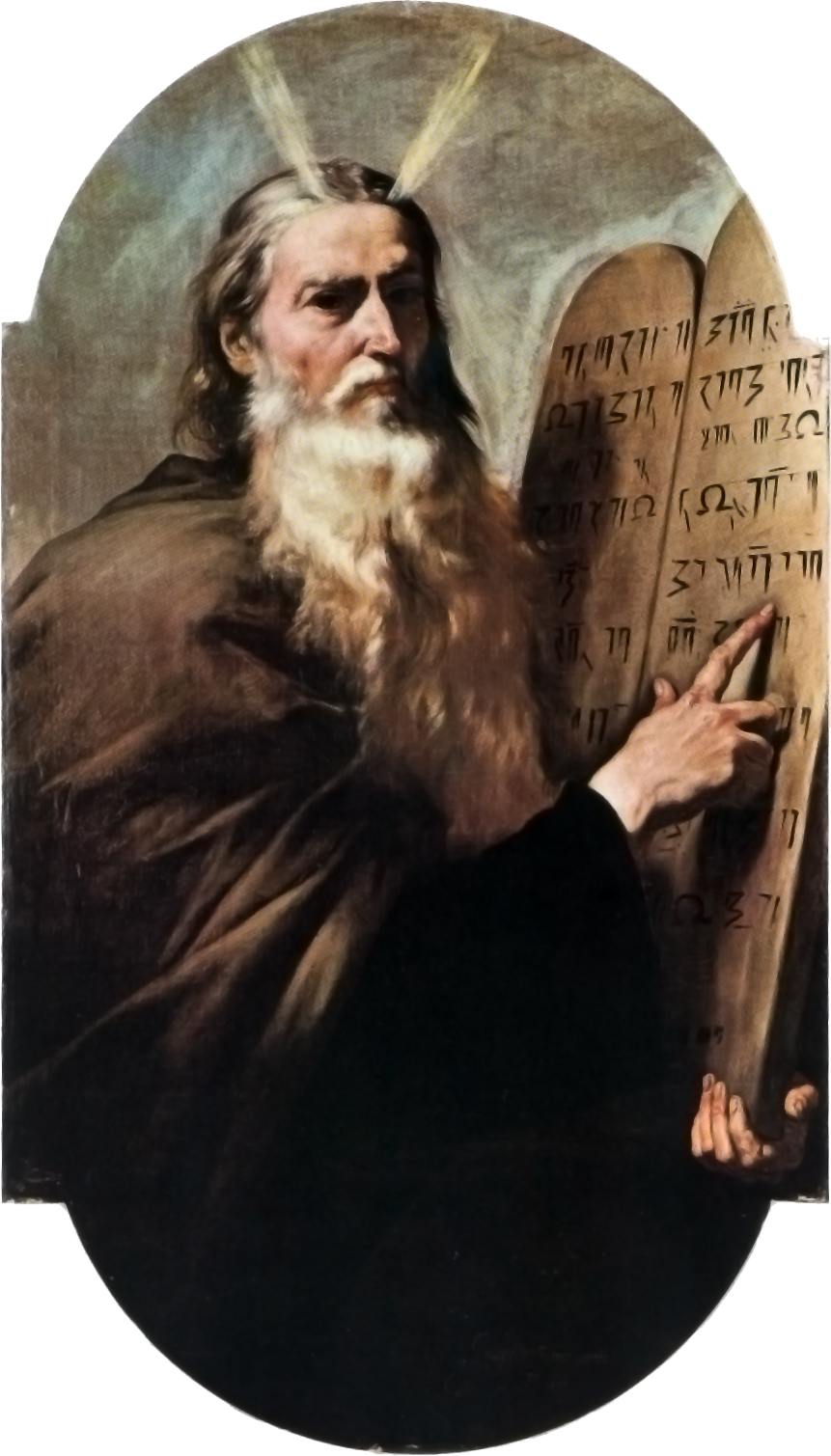
Moses with Radiant Face (1638 painting by José de Ribera)

=== Sixth reading—Exodus 34:10–26 ===
In the sixth reading, God replied by making a covenant to work unprecedented wonders and to drive out the peoples of the Promised Land. God warned Moses against making a covenant with them, lest they become a snare and induce the Israelites' children to lust after their gods. God commanded that the Israelites not make molten gods, that they consecrate or redeem every first-born, that they observe the Sabbath, that they observe the Three Pilgrim Festivals, that they not offer sacrifices with anything leavened, that they not leave the Passover lamb lying until morning, that they bring choice firstfruits to the house of the Lord, and that they not boil a kid in its mother's milk. The sixth reading and the ninth open portion end here.

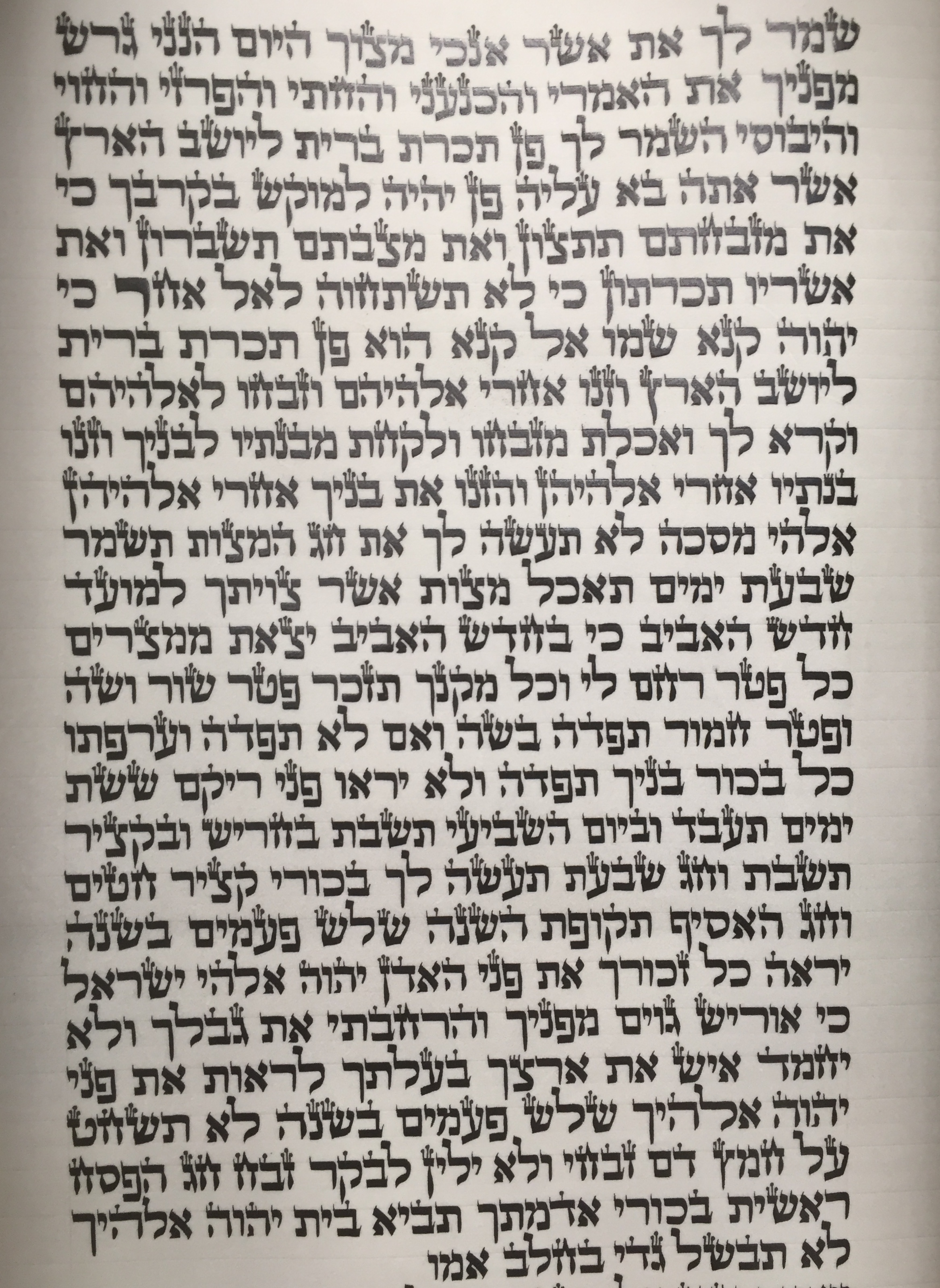
The ר in the word אַחֵר of verse 34:14 is enlarged.

=== Seventh reading—Exodus 34:27–35 ===
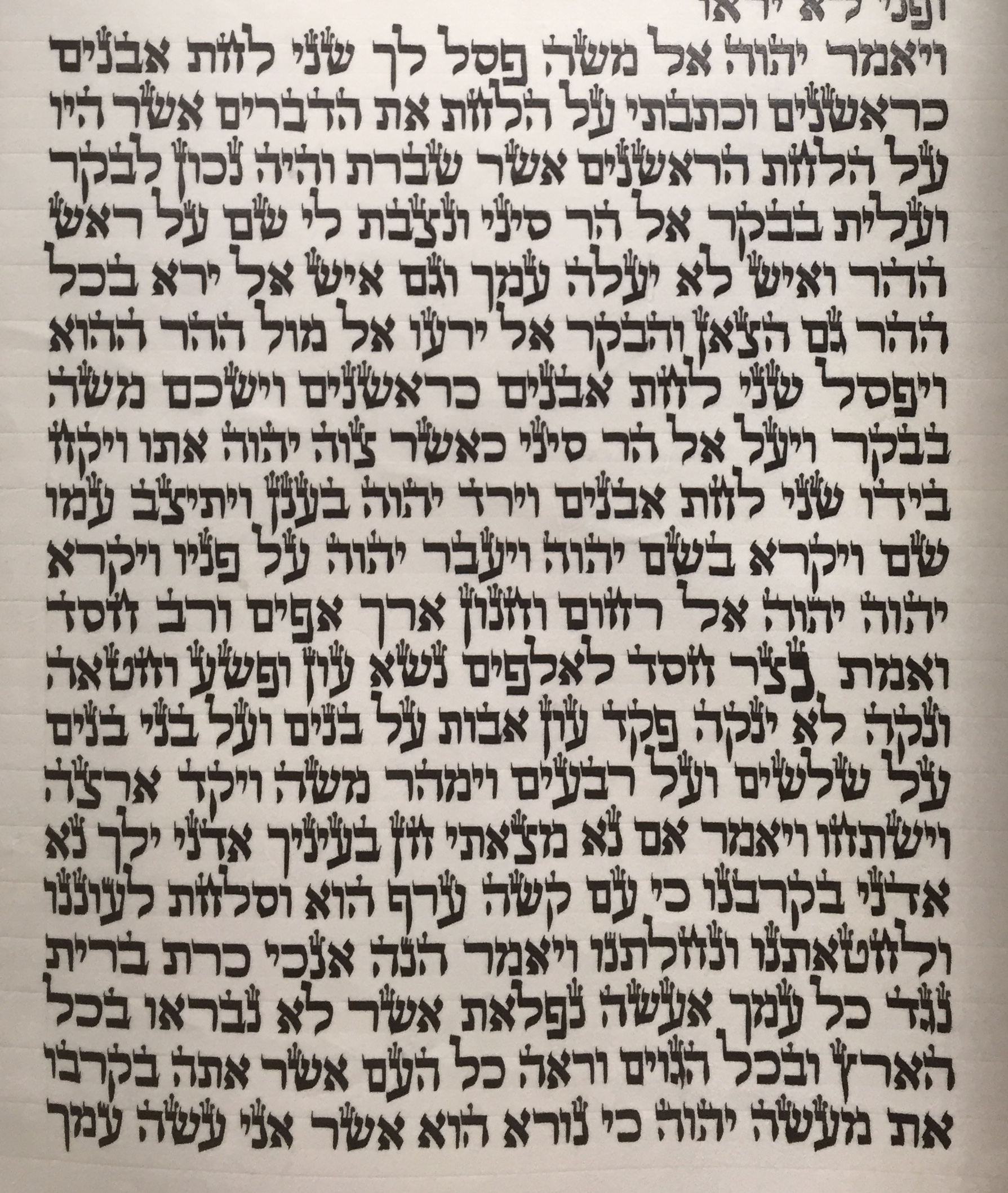
In a scroll the (נֹ in the words (נֹצֵר חֶסֶד לָאֲלָפִים is enlarged.

In the seventh reading, Moses stayed with God 40 days and 40 nights, ate no bread, drank no water, and wrote down on the tablets the terms of the covenant. As Moses came down from the mountain bearing the two tablets, the skin of his face was radiant, and the Israelites shrank from him. Moses called them near and instructed them concerning all that God had commanded.

In the maftir (מפטיר) reading of Exodus 34:33–35 that concludes the parashah, when Moses finished speaking, he put a veil over his face. When Moses spoke with God, Moses would take his veil off. And when he came out, he would tell the Israelites what God had commanded, and then Moses would put the veil back over his face again. The parashah and the final closed portion end here with the end of chapter 34.

=== Readings according to the triennial cycle ===
Jews who read the Torah according to the triennial cycle of Torah reading read the parashah according to the following schedule:

	Year 1	Year 2	Year 3
	2023, 2026, 2029 . . .	2024, 2027, 2030 . . .	2025, 2028, 2031 . . .
Reading	30:11–31:17	31:18–33:11	33:12–34:35
1	30:11–13	31:18–32:6	33:12–16
2	30:14–16	32:7–11	33:17–23
3	30:17–21	32:12–14	34:1–9
4	30:22–33	32:15–24	34:10–17
5	30:34–38	32:25–29	34:18–21
6	31:1–11	32:30–33:6	34:22–26
7	31:12–17	33:7–11	34:27–35
Maftir	31:15–17	33:9–11	34:33–35

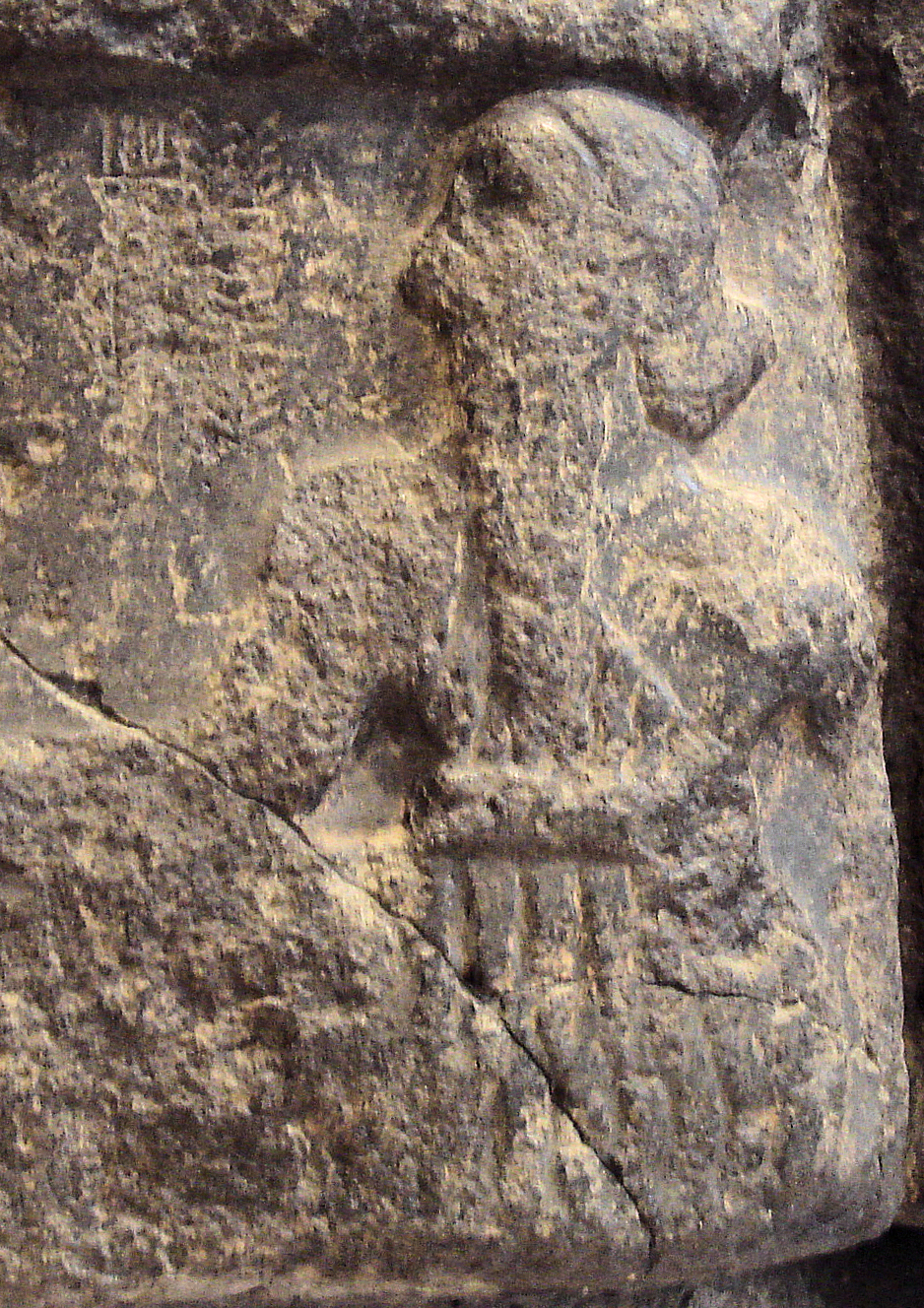
Sargon

== In ancient parallels ==
The parashah has parallels in these ancient sources:

=== Exodus chapter 31 ===
Noting that Sargon of Akkad was the first to use a seven-day week, Gregory Aldrete speculated that the Israelites may have adopted the idea from the Akkadian Empire.

=== Exodus chapter 33 ===
Exodus 3:8 and 17, 13:5, and 33:3, Leviticus 20:24, Numbers 13:27 and 14:8, and Deuteronomy 6:3, 11:9, 26:9 and 15, 27:3, and 31:20 describe the Land of Israel as a land flowing "with milk and honey." Similarly, the Middle Egyptian (early second millennium BCE) tale of Sinuhe Palestine described the Land of Israel or, as the Egyptian tale called it, the land of Yaa: "It was a good land called Yaa. Figs were in it and grapes. It had more wine than water. Abundant was its honey, plentiful its oil. All kind of fruit were on its trees. Barley was there and emmer, and no end of cattle of all kinds."

== In inner-Biblical interpretation ==
The parashah has parallels or is discussed in these Biblical sources:

=== Exodus chapters 25–39 ===
This is the pattern of instruction and construction of the Tabernacle and its furnishings:

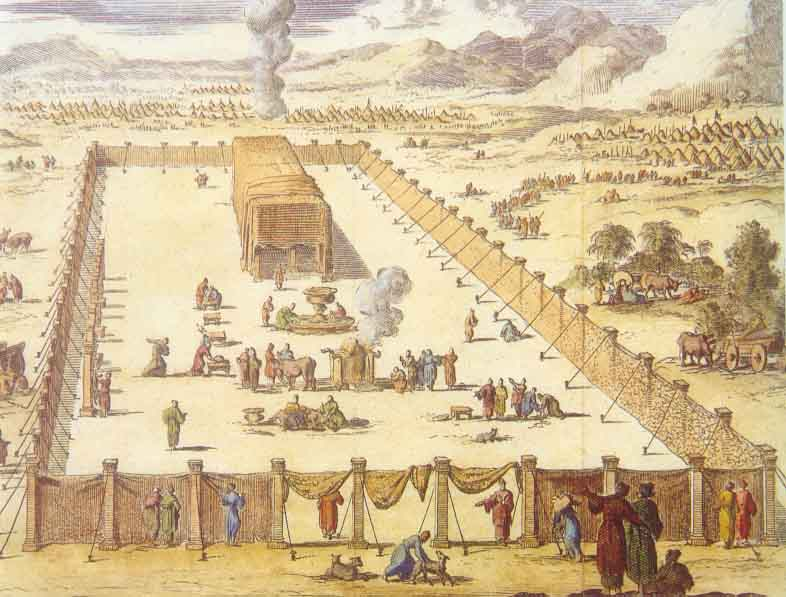
The Tabernacle

Item	Instruction		Construction	
Item	Order	Verses	Order	Verses
Contributions	1	Exodus 25:1–9	2	Exodus 35:4–29
Ark	2	Exodus 25:10–22	5	Exodus 37:1–9
Table	3	Exodus 25:23–30	6	Exodus 37:10–16
Menorah	4	Exodus 25:31–40	7	Exodus 37:17–24
Tabernacle	5	Exodus 26:1–37	4	Exodus 36:8–38
Altar of Sacrifice	6	Exodus 27:1–8	11	Exodus 38:1–7
Tabernacle Court	7	Exodus 27:9–19	13	Exodus 38:9–20
Lamp	8	Exodus 27:20–21	16	Numbers 8:1–4
Priestly Garments	9	Exodus 28:1–43	14	Exodus 39:1–31
Ordination Ritual	10	Exodus 29:1–46	15	Leviticus 8:1–9:24
Altar of Insense	11	Exodus 30:1–10	8	Exodus 37:25–28
Laver	12	Exodus 30:17–21	12	Exodus 38:8
Anointing Oil	13	Exodus 30:22–33	9	Exodus 37:29
Incense	14	Exodus 30:34–38	10	Exodus 37:29
Craftspeople	15	Exodus 31:1–11	3	Exodus 35:30–36:7
The Sabbath	16	Exodus 31:12–17	1	Exodus 35:1–3

The Priestly story of the Tabernacle in Exodus 30–31 echoes the Priestly story of creation in Genesis 1:1–2:3. As the creation story unfolds in seven days, the instructions about the Tabernacle unfold in seven speeches. In both creation and Tabernacle accounts, the text notes the completion of the task. In both creation and Tabernacle, the work done is seen to be good. In both creation and Tabernacle, when the work is finished, God takes an action in acknowledgement. In both creation and Tabernacle, when the work is finished, a blessing is invoked. And in both creation and Tabernacle, God declares something "holy."

Martin Buber and others noted that the language used to describe the building of the Tabernacle parallels that used in the story of creation. Jeffrey Tigay noted that the lampstand held seven candles, Aaron wore seven sacral vestments, the account of the building of the Tabernacle alludes to the creation account, and the Tabernacle was completed on New Year's Day. And Carol Meyers noted that Exodus 25:1–9 and 35:4–29 list seven kinds of substances—metals, yarn, skins, wood, oil, spices, and gemstones—signifying the totality of supplies.

=== Exodus chapter 31 ===
2 Chronicles 1:5–6 reports that the bronze altar, which Exodus 38:1–2 reports Bezalel made, still stood before the Tabernacle in Solomon's time, and Solomon sacrificed a thousand burnt offerings on it.

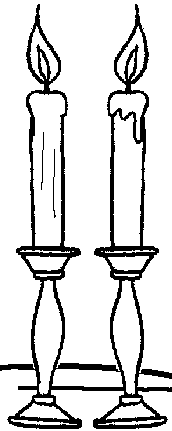
Sabbath candles

==== The Sabbath ====
Exodus 31:12–17 refers to the Sabbath. Commentators note that the Hebrew Bible repeats the commandment to observe the Sabbath 12 times.

Genesis 2:1–3 reports that on the seventh day of Creation, God finished God's work, rested, and blessed and hallowed the seventh day.

The Sabbath is one of the Ten Commandments. Exodus 20:8–11 commands that one remember the Sabbath day, keep it holy, and not do any manner of work or cause anyone under one's control to work, for in six days God made heaven and earth and rested on the seventh day, blessed the Sabbath, and hallowed it. Deuteronomy 5:12–15 commands that one observe the Sabbath day, keep it holy, and not do any manner of work or cause anyone under one's control to work—so that one's subordinates might also rest—and remember that the Israelites were servants in the land of Egypt, and God brought them out with a mighty hand and by an outstretched arm.

In the incident of the manna (מָן, man) in Exodus 16:22–30, Moses told the Israelites that the Sabbath is a solemn rest day; prior to the Sabbath one should cook what one would cook, and lay up food for the Sabbath. And God told Moses to let no one go out of one's place on the seventh day.

In Exodus 31:12–17, just before giving Moses the second tablets, God commanded that the Israelites keep and observe the Sabbath throughout their generations, as a sign between God and the children of Israel forever, for in six days God made heaven and earth, and on the seventh day God rested.

In Exodus 35:1–3, just before issuing the instructions for the Tabernacle, Moses again told the Israelites that no one should work on the Sabbath, specifying that one must not kindle fire on the Sabbath.

In Leviticus 23:1–3, God told Moses to repeat the Sabbath commandment to the people, calling the Sabbath a holy convocation.

The prophet Isaiah taught in Isaiah 1:12–13 that iniquity is inconsistent with the Sabbath. In Isaiah 58:13–14, the prophet taught that if people turn away from pursuing or speaking of business on the Sabbath and call the Sabbath a delight, then God will make them ride upon the high places of the earth and will feed them with the heritage of Jacob. And in Isaiah 66:23, the prophet taught that in times to come, from one Sabbath to another, all people will come to worship God.

The prophet Jeremiah taught in Jeremiah 17:19–27 that the fate of Jerusalem depended on whether the people abstained from work on the Sabbath, refraining from carrying burdens outside their houses and through the city gates.

The prophet Ezekiel told in Ezekiel 20:10–22 how God gave the Israelites God's Sabbaths, to be a sign between God and them, but the Israelites rebelled against God by profaning the Sabbaths, provoking God to pour out God's fury upon them, but God stayed God's hand.

In Nehemiah 13:15–22, Nehemiah told how he saw some treading winepresses on the Sabbath, and others bringing all manner of burdens into Jerusalem on the Sabbath day, so when it began to be dark before the Sabbath, he commanded that the city gates be shut and not opened till after the Sabbath and directed the Levites to keep the gates to sanctify the Sabbath.

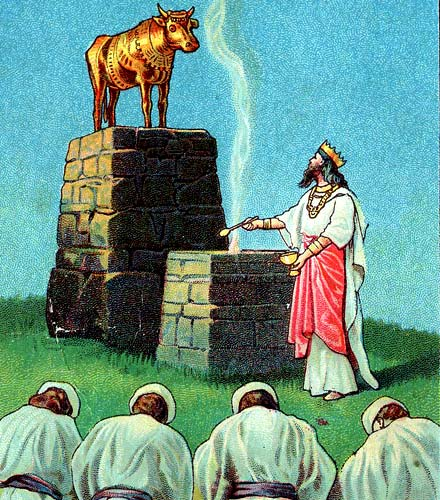
Jeroboam's Idolatry (illustration from a Bible card published 1904 by the Providence Lithograph Company)

=== Exodus chapter 32 ===
The report of Exodus 32:1 that "the people assembled" ((וַיִּקָּהֵל הָעָם, vayikahel ha'am) is echoed in Exodus 35:1, which opens, "And Moses assembled" ((וַיַּקְהֵל מֹשֶׁה, vayakhel Mosheh).

1 Kings 12:25–33 reports a parallel story of golden calves. King Jeroboam of the northern Kingdom of Israel made two calves of gold out of a desire to prevent the kingdom from returning to allegiance to the house of David and the southern Kingdom of Judah. In Exodus 32:4, the people said of the Golden Calf, "This is your god, O Israel, that brought you up out of the land of Egypt." Similarly, in 1 Kings 12:28, Jeroboam told the people of his golden calves, "You have gone up long enough to Jerusalem; behold your gods, O Israel, that brought you up out of the land of Egypt." Jeroboam set up one of the calves in Bethel, and the other in Dan, and the people went to worship before the calf in Dan. Jeroboam made houses of high places, and made priests from people who were not Levites. He ordained a feast like Sukkot on the fifteenth day of the eighth month (a month after the real Sukkot), and he went up to the altar at Bethel to sacrifice to the golden calves that he had made, and he installed his priests there.

In Exodus 32:13 and Deuteronomy 9:27, Moses called on God to "remember" God's covenant with Abraham, Isaac, and Jacob to deliver the Israelites from God's wrath after the incident of the Golden Calf. Similarly, God remembered Noah to deliver him from the flood in Genesis 8:1; God promised to remember God's covenant not to destroy the Earth again by flood in Genesis 9:15–16; God remembered Abraham to deliver Lot from the destruction of Sodom and Gomorrah in Genesis 19:29; God remembered Rachel to deliver her from childlessness in Genesis 30:22; God remembered God's covenant with Abraham, Isaac, and Jacob to deliver the Israelites from Egyptian bondage in Exodus 2:24 and 6:5–6; God promised to "remember" God's covenant with Jacob, Isaac, and Abraham to deliver the Israelites and the Land of Israel in Leviticus 26:42–45; the Israelites were to blow upon their trumpets to be remembered and delivered from their enemies in Numbers 10:9; Samson called on God to deliver him from the Philistines in Judges 16:28; Hannah prayed for God to remember her and deliver her from childlessness in 1 Samuel 1:11 and God remembered Hannah's prayer to deliver her from childlessness in 1 Samuel 1:19; Hezekiah called on God to remember Hezekiah's faithfulness to deliver him from sickness in 2 Kings 20:3 and Isaiah 38:3; Jeremiah called on God to remember God's covenant with the Israelites to not condemn them in Jeremiah 14:21; Jeremiah called on God to remember him and think of him, and avenge him of his persecutors in Jeremiah 15:15; God promises to remember God's covenant with the Israelites and establish an everlasting covenant in Ezekiel 16:60; God remembers the cry of the humble in Zion to avenge them in Psalm 9:13; David called upon God to remember God's compassion and mercy in Psalm 25:6; Asaph called on God to remember God's congregation to deliver them from their enemies in Psalm 74:2; God remembered that the Israelites were only human in Psalm 78:39; Ethan the Ezrahite called on God to remember how short Ethan's life was in Psalm 89:48; God remembers that humans are but dust in Psalm 103:14; God remembers God's covenant with Abraham, Isaac, and Jacob in Psalm 105:8–10; God remembers God's word to Abraham to deliver the Israelites to the Land of Israel in Psalm 105:42–44; the Psalmist calls on God to remember him to favor God's people, to think of him at God's salvation, that he might behold the prosperity of God's people in Psalm 106:4–5; God remembered God's covenant and repented according to God's mercy to deliver the Israelites in the wake of their rebellion and iniquity in Psalm 106:4–5; the Psalmist calls on God to remember God's word to God's servant to give him hope in Psalm 119:49; God remembered us in our low estate to deliver us from our adversaries in Psalm 136:23–24; Job called on God to remember him to deliver him from God's wrath in Job 14:13; Nehemiah prayed to God to remember God's promise to Moses to deliver the Israelites from exile in Nehemiah 1:8; and Nehemiah prayed to God to remember him to deliver him for good in Nehemiah 13:14–31.

=== Exodus chapter 34 ===
The American historian William Propp found variants or citations of Exodus 34:6–7 (the Attributes of God) in Exodus 20:5–6; Numbers 14:18; Deuteronomy 5:9–10; Jeremiah 30:11; 32:18–19; 46:28; 49:12; Joel 2:13, Jonah 4:2; Micah 7:18–20; Nahum 1:2; Psalms 103; 145:8; Lamentations 3:32; Daniel 9:4; and Nehemiah 9:17, as if the words were known to all.

James Limburg asked whether the Book of Jonah might be a midrash on a text like Exodus 34:6.

Benjamin Sommer read Exodus 34:6–7 and Numbers 14:18–20 to teach that God punishes children for their parents' sins as a sign of mercy to the parents: When sinning parents repent, God defers their punishment to their offspring. Sommer argued that other Biblical writers, engaging in inner-Biblical interpretation, rejected that notion in Deuteronomy 7:9–10, Jonah 4:2, and Psalm 103:8–10. Sommer argued that Psalm 103:8–10, for example, quoted Exodus 34:6–7, which was already an authoritative and holy text, but revised the morally troubling part: Where Exodus 34:7 taught that God punishes sin for generations, Psalm 103:9–10 maintained that God does not contend forever. Sommer argued that Deuteronomy 7:9–10 and Jonah 4:2 similarly quoted Exodus 34:6–7 with revision. Sommer asserted that Deuteronomy 7:9–10, Jonah 4:2, and Psalm 103:8–10 do not try to tell us how to read Exodus 34:6–7; that is, they do not argue that Exodus 34:6–7 somehow means something other than what it seems to say. Rather, they repeat Exodus 34:6–7 while also disagreeing with part of it.

==== Passover ====
Exodus 34:18 refers to the Festival of Passover, calling it "the Feast of Unleavened Bread." In the Hebrew Bible, Passover is called:

- "Passover" ((פֶּסַח, Pesach);
- "The Feast of Unleavened Bread" ((חַג הַמַּצּוֹת, Chag haMatzot); and
- "A holy convocation" or "a solemn assembly" ((מִקְרָא-קֹדֶשׁ, mikrah kodesh).

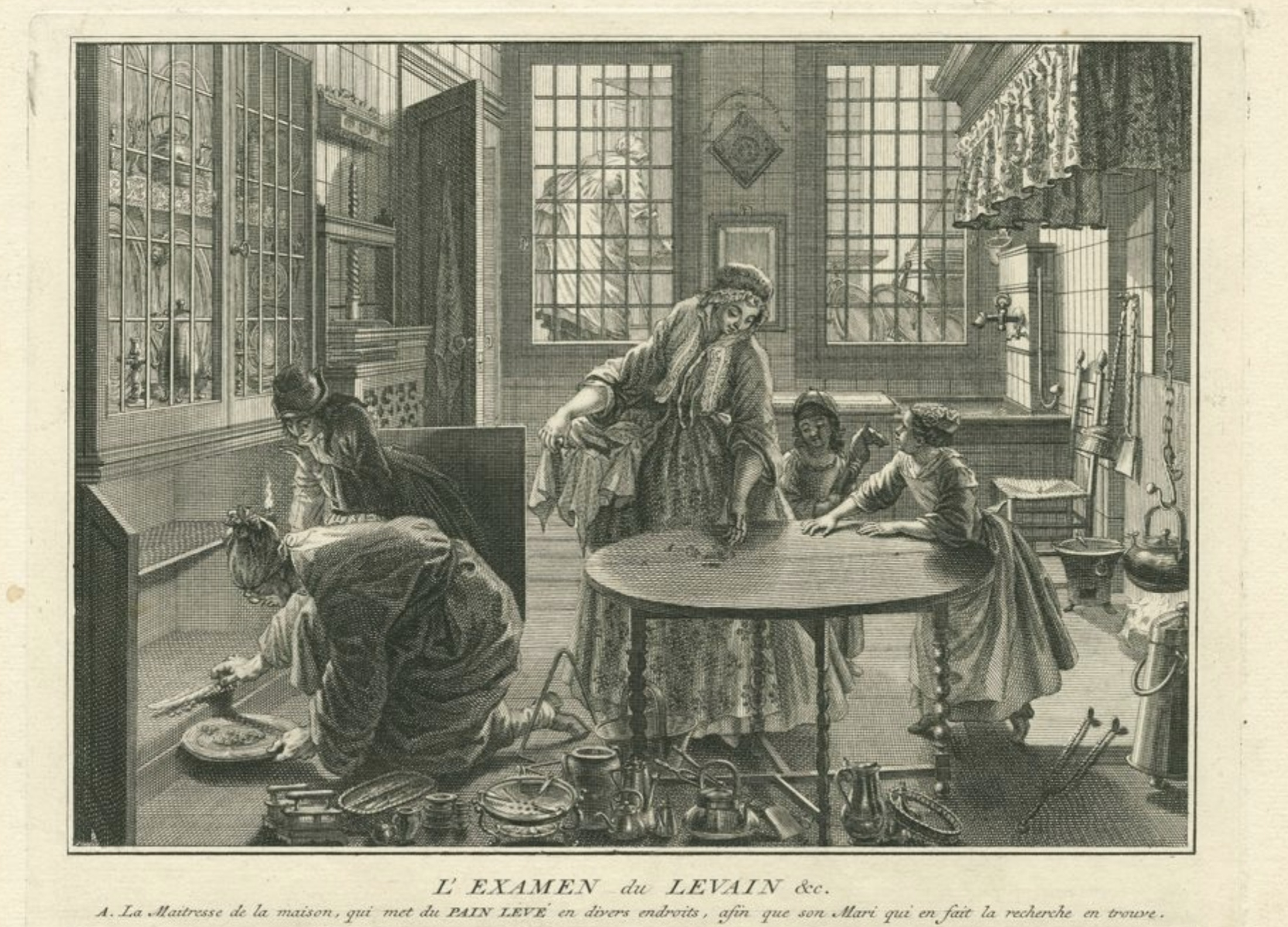
The Search for Leaven (illustration circa 1733–1739 by Bernard Picart)

Some explain the double nomenclature of "Passover" and "Feast of Unleavened Bread" as referring to two separate feasts that the Israelites combined sometime between the Exodus and when the Biblical text became settled. Exodus 34:18–20 and Deuteronomy 15:19–16:8 indicate that the dedication of the firstborn also became associated with the festival.

Some believe that the "Feast of Unleavened Bread" was an agricultural festival at which the Israelites celebrated the beginning of the grain harvest. Moses may have had this festival in mind when in Exodus 5:1 and 10:9 he petitioned Pharaoh to let the Israelites go to celebrate a feast in the wilderness.

"Passover," on the other hand, was associated with a thanksgiving sacrifice of a lamb, also called "the Passover," "the Passover lamb," or "the Passover offering."

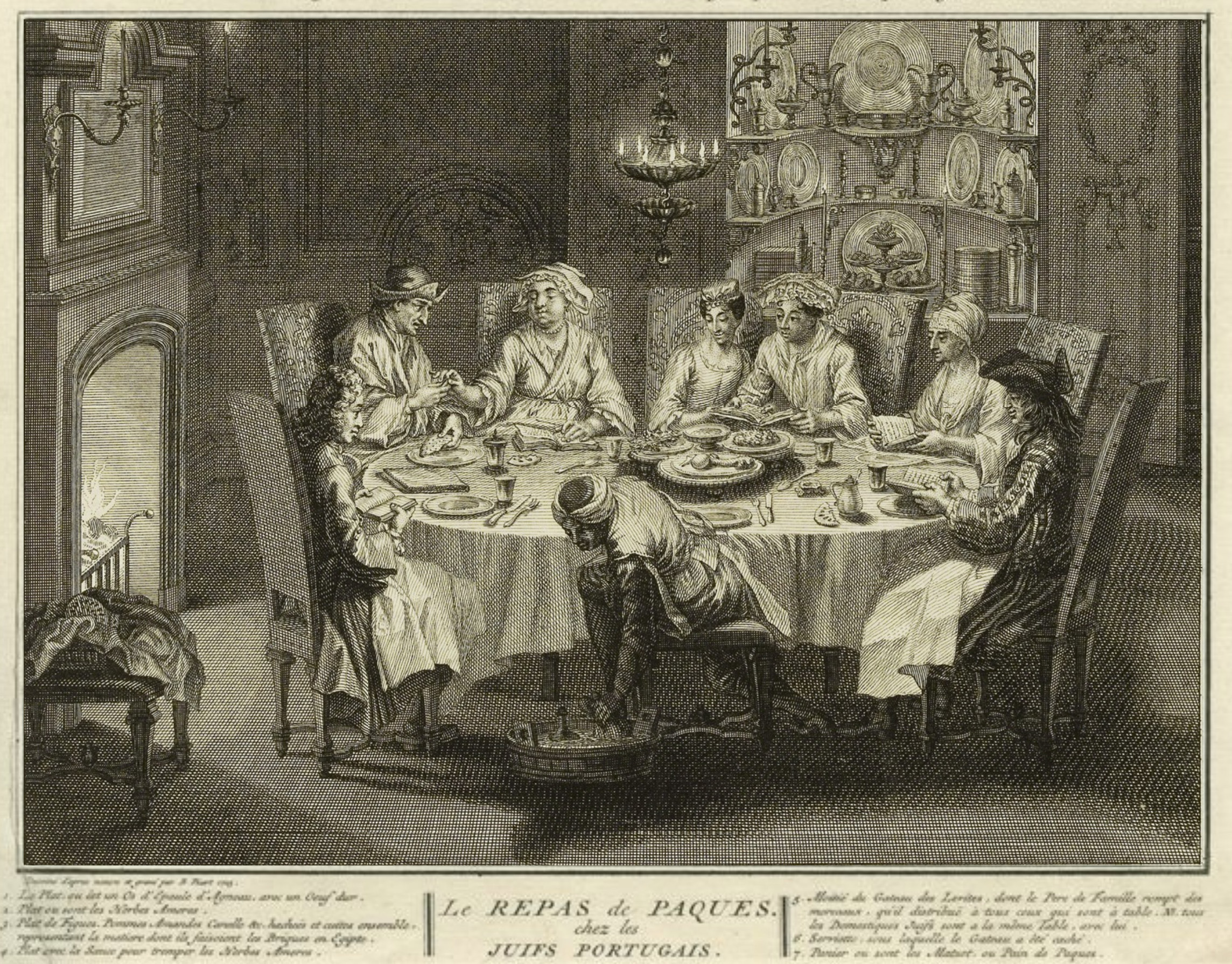
The Passover Seder of the Portuguese Jews (illustration circa 1733–1739 by Bernard Picart)

Exodus 12:5–6, Leviticus 23:5, and Numbers 9:3 and 5, and 28:16 direct "Passover" to take place on the evening of the fourteenth of Aviv (Nisan in the Hebrew calendar after the Babylonian captivity). Joshua 5:10, Ezekiel 45:21, Ezra 6:19, and 2 Chronicles 35:1 confirm that practice. Exodus 12:18–19, 23:15, and 34:18, Leviticus 23:6, and Ezekiel 45:21 direct the "Feast of Unleavened Bread" to take place over seven days and Leviticus 23:6 and Ezekiel 45:21 direct that it begin on the fifteenth of the month. Some believe that the proximity of the dates of the two festivals led to their confusion and merger.

Exodus 12:23 and 27 link the word "Passover" (Pesach, (פֶּסַח) to God's act to "pass over" (pasach, (פָסַח) the Israelites' houses in the plague of the firstborn. In the Torah, the consolidated Passover and Feast of Unleavened Bread thus commemorate the Israelites' liberation from Egypt.

The Hebrew Bible frequently notes the Israelites' observance of Passover at turning points in their history. Numbers 9:1–5 reports God's direction to the Israelites to observe Passover in the wilderness of Sinai on the anniversary of their liberation from Egypt. Joshua 5:10–11 reports that upon entering the Promised Land, the Israelites kept the Passover on the plains of Jericho and ate unleavened cakes and parched corn, produce of the land, the next day. 2 Kings 23:21–23 reports that King Josiah commanded the Israelites to keep the Passover in Jerusalem as part of Josiah's reforms, but also notes that the Israelites had not kept such a Passover from the days of the Biblical judges nor in all the days of the kings of Israel or the kings of Judah, calling into question the observance of even Kings David and Solomon. The more reverent 2 Chronicles 8:12–13, however, reports that Solomon offered sacrifices on the festivals, including the Feast of Unleavened Bread. And 2 Chronicles 30:1–27 reports King Hezekiah's observance of a second Passover anew, as sufficient numbers of neither the priests nor the people were prepared to do so before then. And Ezra 6:19–22 reports that the Israelites returned from the Babylonian captivity observed Passover, ate the Passover lamb, and kept the Feast of Unleavened Bread seven days with joy.

==== Shavuot ====
Exodus 34:22 refers to the Festival of Shavuot. In the Hebrew Bible, Shavuot is called:

- The Feast of Weeks ((חַג שָׁבֻעֹת, Chag Shavuot);
- The Day of the Firstfruits ((יוֹם הַבִּכּוּרִים, Yom haBikurim);
- The Feast of Harvest ((חַג הַקָּצִיר, Chag haKatzir); and
- A holy convocation ((מִקְרָא-קֹדֶשׁ, mikrah kodesh).

Exodus 34:22 associates Shavuot with the firstfruits ((בִּכּוּרֵי, bikurei) of the wheat harvest. In turn, Deuteronomy 26:1–11 set out the ceremony for the bringing of the firstfruits.

To arrive at the correct date, Leviticus 23:15 instructs counting seven weeks from the day after the day of rest of Passover, the day that they brought the sheaf of barley for waving. Similarly, Deuteronomy 16:9 directs counting seven weeks from when they first put the sickle to the standing barley.

Leviticus 23:16–19 sets out a course of offerings for the fiftieth day, including a meal-offering of two loaves made from fine flour from the firstfruits of the harvest; burnt-offerings of seven lambs, one bullock, and two rams; a sin-offering of a goat; and a peace-offering of two lambs. Similarly, Numbers 28:26–30 sets out a course of offerings including a meal-offering; burnt-offerings of two bullocks, one ram, and seven lambs; and one goat to make atonement. Deuteronomy 16:10 directs a freewill-offering in relation to God's blessing.

Leviticus 23:21 and Numbers 28:26 ordain a holy convocation in which the Israelites were not to work.

2 Chronicles 8:13 reports that Solomon offered burnt-offerings on the Feast of Weeks.

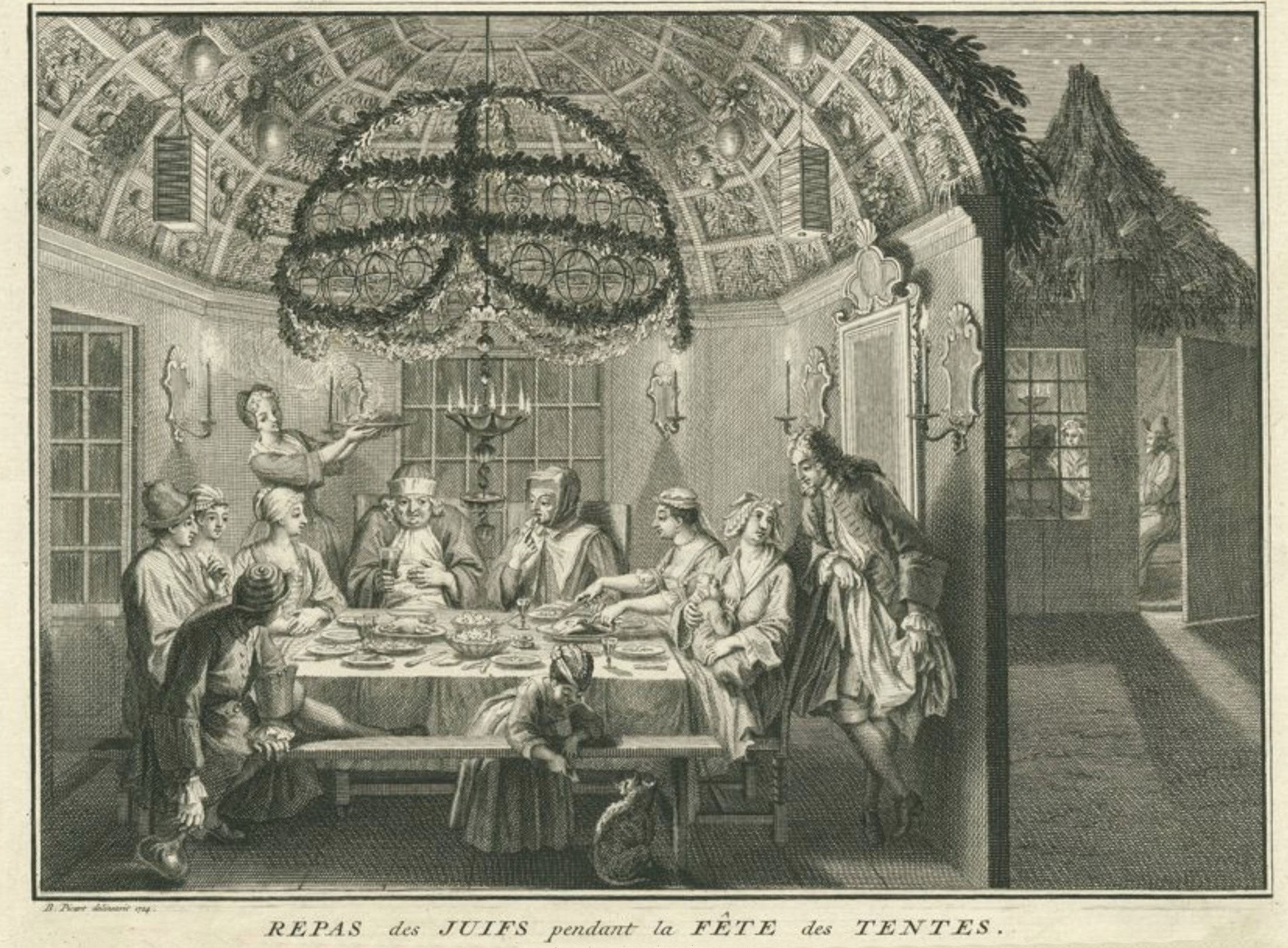
Family feast in a Sukkah with foliage canopy and chandelier (engraving by Bernard Picart, 1724)

==== Sukkot ====
And Exodus 34:22 refers to the Festival of Sukkot, calling it "the Feast of Ingathering." In the Hebrew Bible, Sukkot is called:

- "The Feast of Tabernacles (or Booths)";
- "The Feast of Ingathering";
- "The Feast" or "the festival";
- "The Feast of the Lord";
- "The festival of the seventh month"; and
- "A holy convocation" or "a sacred occasion."

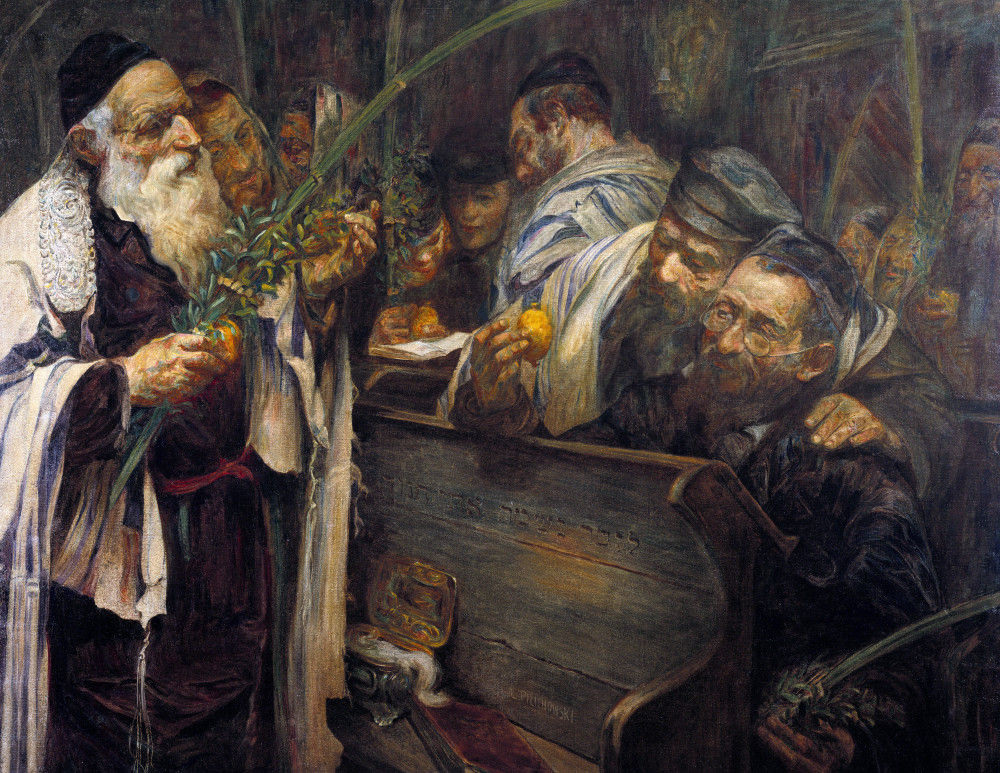
Celebrating Sukkot with the Four Species (painting circa 1894–1895 by Leopold Pilichowski)

Sukkot's agricultural origin is evident from the name "The Feast of Ingathering," from the ceremonies accompanying it, and from the season and occasion of its celebration: "At the end of the year when you gather in your labors out of the field"; "after you have gathered in from your threshing-floor and from your winepress." It was a thanksgiving for the fruit harvest. And in what may explain the festival's name, Isaiah reports that grape harvesters kept booths in their vineyards. Coming as it did at the completion of the harvest, Sukkot was regarded as a general thanksgiving for the bounty of nature in the year that had passed.

Sukkot became one of the most important feasts in Judaism, as indicated by its designation as "the Feast of the Lord" or simply "the Feast." Perhaps because of its wide attendance, Sukkot became the appropriate time for important state ceremonies. Moses instructed the children of Israel to gather for a reading of the Law during Sukkot every seventh year. King Solomon dedicated the Temple in Jerusalem on Sukkot. And Sukkot was the first sacred occasion observed after the resumption of sacrifices in Jerusalem after the Babylonian captivity.

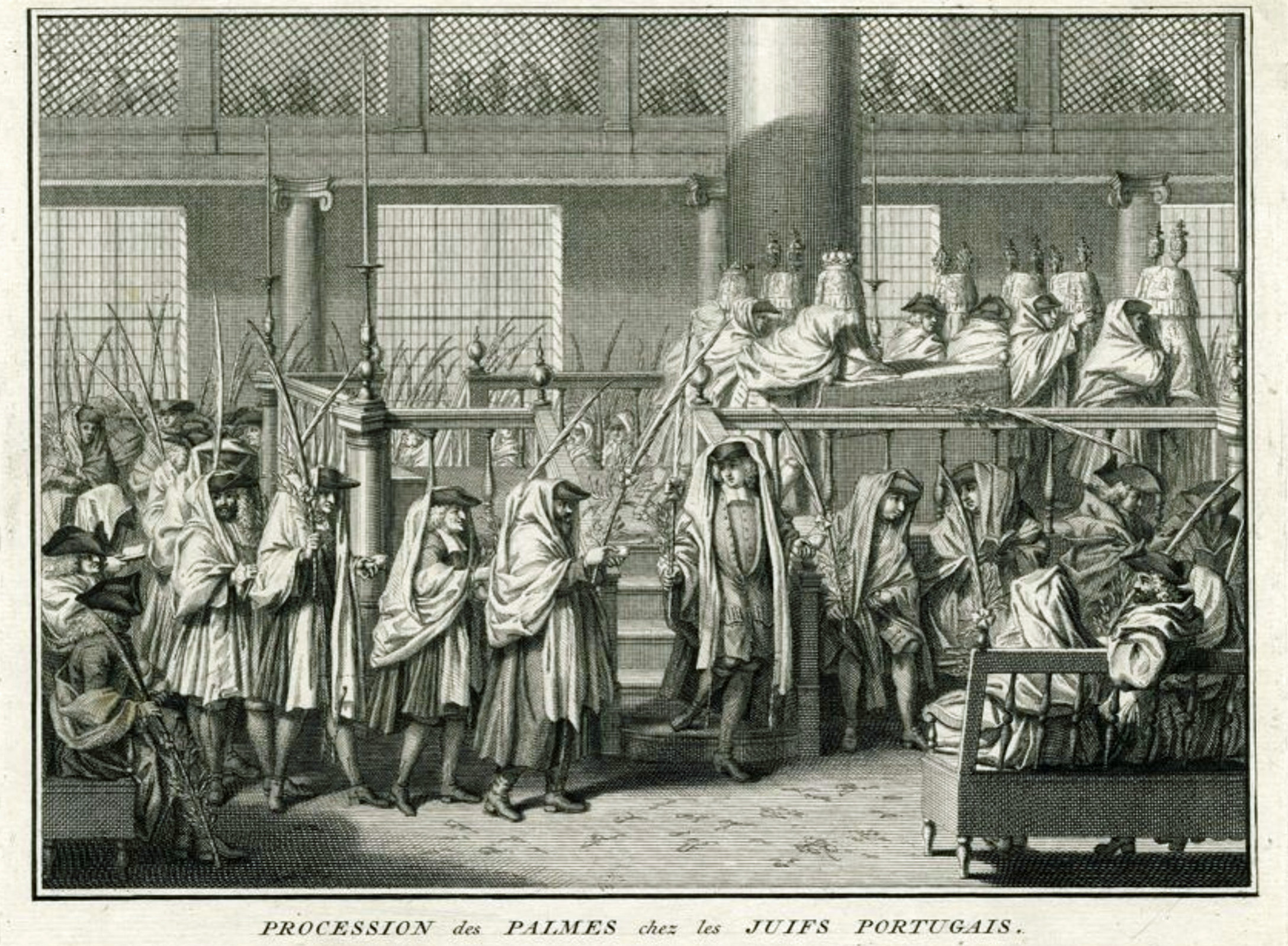
Sephardic Jews Observe Hoshanah Rabbah (engraving circa 1723–1743 by Bernard Picart)

In the time of Nehemiah, after the Babylonian captivity, the Israelites celebrated Sukkot by making and dwelling in booths, a practice of which Nehemiah reports: "the Israelites had not done so from the days of Joshua." In a practice related to that of the Four Species, Nehemiah also reports that the Israelites found in the Law the commandment that they "go out to the mountains and bring leafy branches of olive trees, pine trees, myrtles, palms and [other] leafy trees to make booths." In Leviticus 23:40, God told Moses to command the people: "On the first day you shall take the product of hadar trees, branches of palm trees, boughs of leafy trees, and willows of the brook," and "You shall live in booths seven days; all citizens in Israel shall live in booths, in order that future generations may know that I made the Israelite people live in booths when I brought them out of the land of Egypt." The book of Numbers, however, indicates that while in the wilderness, the Israelites dwelt in tents. Some secular scholars consider Leviticus 23:39–43 (the commandments regarding booths and the four species) to be an insertion by a later redactor.

King Jeroboam of the northern Kingdom of Israel, whom 1 Kings 13:33 describes as practicing "his evil way," celebrated a festival on the fifteenth day of the eighth month, one month after Sukkot, "in imitation of the festival in Judah". "While Jeroboam was standing on the altar to present the offering, the man of God, at the command of the Lord, cried out against the altar" in disapproval.

According to the prophet Zechariah, in the messianic era, Sukkot will become a universal festival, and all nations will make pilgrimages annually to Jerusalem to celebrate the feast there.

==== Milk ====
In three separate places—Exodus 23:19 and 34:26 and Deuteronomy 14:21—the Torah prohibits boiling a kid in its mother's milk.

== In early nonrabbinic interpretation ==
The parashah is discussed in these early nonrabbinic sources:

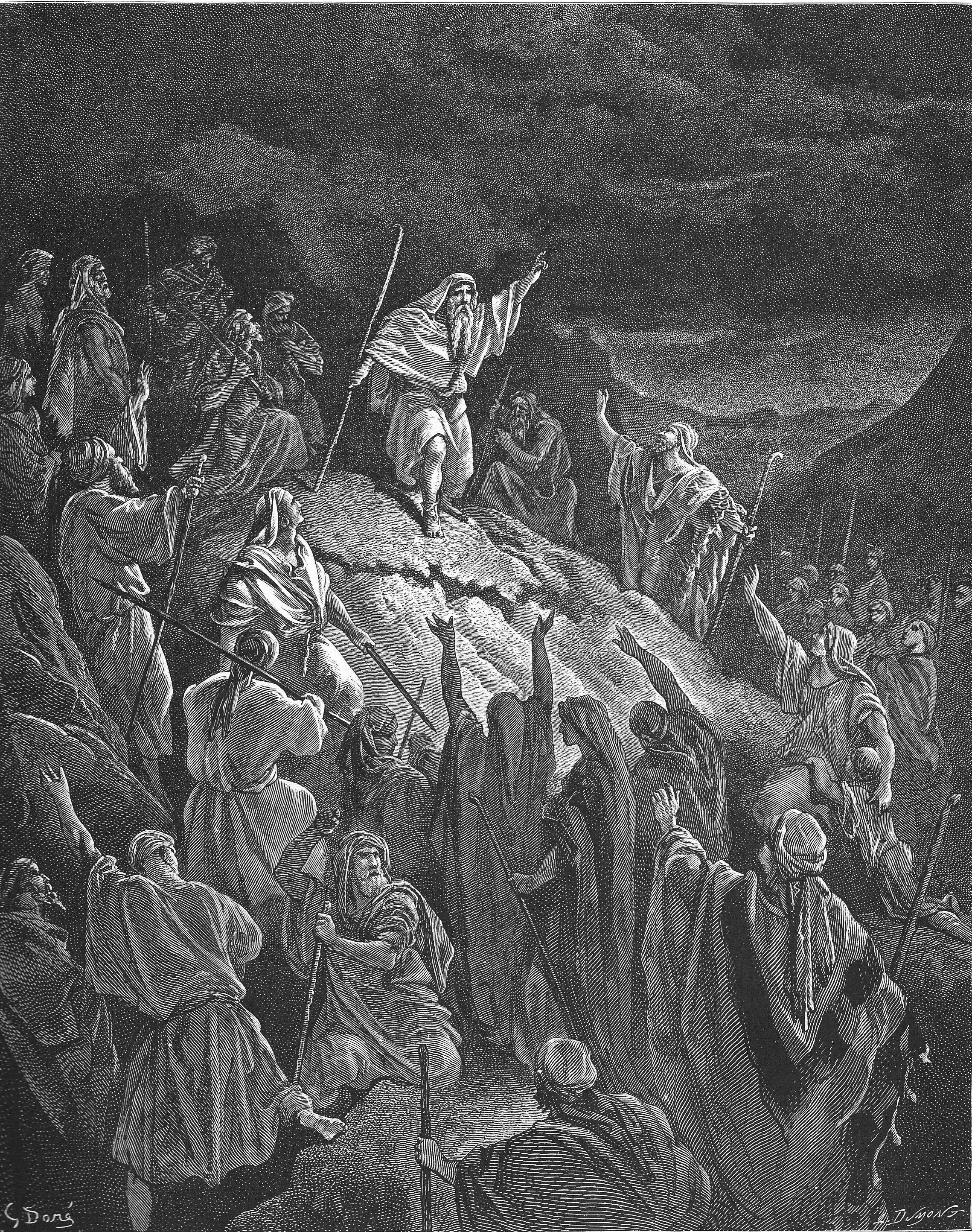
Mattathias appealing to Jewish refugees (illustration by Gustave Doré from the 1866 La Sainte Bible)

=== Exodus chapter 31 ===
Josephus taught that when the Israelites brought together the materials with great diligence, Moses set architects over the works by the command of God. And these were the very same people that the people themselves would have chosen, had the election been allowed to them: Bezalel, the son of Uri, of the tribe of Judah, the grandson of Miriam, the sister of Moses, and Oholiab, file son of Ahisamach, of the tribe of Dan.

1 Maccabees 2:27–38 told how in the second century BCE, many followers of the pious Jewish priest Mattathias rebelled against the Seleucid king Antiochus IV Epiphanes. Antiochus's soldiers attacked a group of them on the Sabbath, and when the Pietists failed to defend themselves so as to honor the Sabbath (commanded in, among other places, Exodus 31:12–17), a thousand died. 1 Maccabees 2:39–41 reported that when Mattathias and his friends heard, they reasoned that if they did not fight on the Sabbath, they would soon be destroyed. So they decided that they would fight against anyone who attacked them on the Sabbath.

== In classical rabbinic interpretation ==
The parashah is discussed in these rabbinic sources from the era of the Mishnah and the Talmud:

=== Exodus chapter 30 ===
The Rabbis taught in a baraita that upon entering a barn to measure the new grain one should recite the blessing, "May it be Your will O Lord, our God, that You may send blessing upon the work of our hands." Once one has begun to measure, one should say, "Blessed be the One who sends blessing into this heap." If, however, one first measured the grain and then recited the blessing, then prayer is in vain, because blessing is not to be found in anything that has been already weighed or measured or numbered, but only in a thing hidden from sight.

Rabbi Abbahu taught that Moses asked God how Israel would be exalted, and God replied in the words of Exodus 30:12 (about collecting the half-shekel tax), "When you raise them up," teaching that collecting contributions from the people elevates them.

Rabbi Eleazar taught that God told David that David called God an inciter, but God would make David stumble over a thing that even school-children knew, namely, that which Exodus 30:12 says, "When you take the sum of the children of Israel according to their number, then shall they give every man a ransom for his soul into the Lord . . . that there be no plague among them." Forthwith, as 1 Chronicles 21:1 reports, "Satan stood up against Israel," and as 2 Samuel 24:1 reports, "He stirred up David against them saying, 'Go, number Israel.'" And when David did number them, he took no ransom from them, and as 2 Samuel 24:15 reports, "So the Lord sent a pestilence upon Israel from the morning even to the time appointed." The Gemara asked what 2 Samuel 24:15 meant by "the time appointed." Samuel the elder, the son-in-law of Rabbi Hanina, answered in the name of Rabbi Hanina: From the time of slaughtering the continual offering (at dawn) until the time of sprinkling the blood. Rabbi Joḥanan said it meant at midday. Reading the continuation of 2 Samuel 24:16, "And He said to the Angel that destroyed the people, 'It is enough ((רַב, rav),'" Rabbi Eleazar taught that God told the Angel to take a great man ((רַב, rav) from among them, through whose death many sins could be expiated. So Abishai son of Zeruiah then died, and he was individually equal in worth to the greater part of the Sanhedrin. Reading 1 Chronicles 21:15, "And as he was about to destroy, the Lord beheld, and He repented," the Gemara ask what God beheld. Rav said God beheld Jacob, as Genesis 32:3 reports, "And Jacob said when he beheld them." Samuel said that God beheld the ashes of the ram of Isaac, as Genesis 22:8 says, "God will see for Himself the lamb." Rabbi Isaac Nappaha taught that God saw the atonement money that Exodus 30:16 reports God required Moses to collect. For in Exodus 30:16, God said, "And you shall take the atonement money from the children of Israel, and shalt appoint it for the service of the tent of meeting, that it may be a memorial for the children of Israel before the Lord, to make atonement for your souls.'" (Thus God said that at some future time, the money would provide atonement.) Alternatively, Rabbi Joḥanan taught that God saw the Temple. For Genesis 22:14 explained the meaning of the name that Abraham gave to the mountain where Abraham nearly sacrificed Isaac to be, "In the mount where the Lord is seen." (Solomon later built the Temple on that mountain, and God saw the merit of the sacrifices there.) Rabbi Jacob bar Iddi and Rabbi Samuel bar Naḥmani differed on the matter. One said that God saw the atonement money that Exodus 30:16 reports God required Moses to collect from the Israelites, while the other said that God saw the Temple. The Gemara concluded that the more likely view was that God saw the Temple, as Genesis 22:14 can be read to say, "As it will be said on that day, 'in the mount where the Lord is seen.'"

The first four chapters of Tractate Shekalim in the Mishnah, Tosefta, Jerusalem Talmud, and Babylonian Talmud interpreted the law of the half-shekel head tax commanded by Exodus 30:13–16.

Reading Exodus 30:13, "This they shall give . . . half a shekel for an offering to the Lord," to indicate that God pointed with God's finger, Rabbi Ishmael said that each of the five fingers of God's right hand appertain to the mystery of Redemption. Rabbi Ishmael said that God showed the little finger of the hand to Noah, pointing out how to make the Ark, as in Genesis 6:15, God says, "And this is how you shall make it." With the second finger, next to the little one, God smote the Egyptians with the ten plagues, as Exodus 8:15 (8:19 in the KJV) says, "The magicians said to Pharaoh, 'This is the finger of God.'" With the middle finger, God wrote the tablets of the Law, as Exodus 31:18 says, "And He gave to Moses, when He had made an end of communing with him . . . tables of stone, written with the finger of God." With the index finger, God showed Moses what the children of Israel should give for the redemption of their souls, as Exodus 30:13 says, "This they shall give . . . half a shekel for an offering to the Lord." With the thumb and all the hand, God will in the future smite God's enemies (who Rabbi Ishmael identified as the children of Esau and Ishmael), as Micah 5:9 says, "Let your hand be lifted up above your adversaries, and let all your enemies be cut off."

A midrash taught that God considers studying the sanctuary's structure as equivalent to rebuilding it.

The Mishnah taught that any sacrifice performed by a priest who had not washed his hands and feet at the laver as required by Exodus 30:18–21 was invalid.

Rabbi Jose the son of Rabbi Hanina taught that a priest was not permitted to wash in a laver that did not contain enough water to wash four priests, for Exodus 40:31 says, "That Moses and Aaron and his sons might wash their hands and their feet thereat." ("His sons" implies at least two priests, and adding Moses and Aaron makes four.)

The Mishnah reported that the High Priest Ben Katin made 12 spigots for the laver, where there had been two before. Ben Katin also made a machine for the laver, so that its water would not become unfit by remaining overnight.

A baraita taught that Josiah hid away the anointing oil referred to in Exodus 30:22–33, the Ark referred to in Exodus 37:1–5, the jar of manna referred to in Exodus 16:33, Aaron's rod with its almonds and blossoms referred to in Numbers 17:23, and the coffer that the Philistines sent the Israelites as a gift along with the Ark and concerning which the priests said in 1 Samuel 6:8, "And put the jewels of gold, which you returned Him for a guilt offering, in a coffer by the side thereof [of the Ark]; and send it away that it may go." Having observed that Deuteronomy 28:36 predicted, "The Lord will bring you and your king . . . to a nation that you have not known," Josiah ordered the Ark hidden away, as 2 Chronicles 35:3 reports, "And he [Josiah] said to the Levites who taught all Israel, that were holy to the Lord, 'Put the Holy Ark into the house that Solomon the son of David, King of Israel, built; there shall no more be a burden upon your shoulders; now serve the Lord your God and his people Israel.'" Rabbi Eleazar deduced that Josiah hid the anointing oil and the other objects at the same time as the Ark from the common use of the expressions "there" in Exodus 16:33 with regard to the manna and "there" in Exodus 30:6 with regard to the Ark, "to be kept" in Exodus 16:33 with regard to the manna and "to be kept" in Numbers 17:25 with regard to Aaron's rod, and "generations" in Exodus 16:33 with regard to the manna and "generations" in Exodus 30:31 with regard to the anointing oil.

The Mishnah counted compounding anointing oil in the formula prescribed in Exodus 30:23–33 and using such sacred anointing oil in a way prohibited by Exodus 30:32 as 2 among 36 transgressions in the Torah punishable with excision ((כרת, karet). The Mishnah taught that for these transgressions, one was liable to excision if one violated the commandment willfully. If one violated the commandment in error, one was liable to a sin offering. If there was a doubt whether one had violated the commandment, one was liable to a suspensive guilt offering, except, taught Rabbi Meir, in the case of one who defiled the Temple or its consecrated things, in which case one was liable to a sliding-scale sacrifice (according to the means of the transgressor, as provided in Leviticus 5:6–11).

Rabbi Judah taught that many miracles attended the anointing oil that Moses made in the wilderness. There were originally only 12 logs (about a gallon) of the oil. Much of it must have been absorbed in the mixing pot, much must have been absorbed in the roots of the spices used, and much of it must have evaporated during cooking. Yet it was used to anoint the Tabernacle and its vessels, Aaron and his sons throughout the seven days of the consecration, and subsequent High Priests and kings. The Gemara deduced from Exodus 30:31, "This ((זֶה, zeh) shall be a holy anointing oil unto Me throughout your generations," that 12 logs existed. The Gemara calculated the numerical value of the Hebrew letters in the word (זֶה, zeh ("this") to be 12 (employing Gematria, where (ז equals 7 and (ה equals 5), indicating that 12 logs of the oil were preserved throughout time.

=== Exodus chapter 31 ===
A midrash noted that in Exodus 31:3 God told Moses, "See, I have called." The midrash taught that when Moses ascended Mount Sinai, God showed him all the vessels of the Tabernacle and told him, “You shall craft a candelabrum" (in Exodus 25:31), "You shall craft a table" (in Exodus 25:23), "You shall craft an altar" (in Exodus 30:1), and so for all the crafting of the Tabernacle. Moses thus prepared to descend Mount Sinai under the impression that he would be crafting these items. God then told Moses that God had made him like a king, and it is not the way of a king to craft anything, but rather, the king decrees and others craft. Thus in Exodus 31:3, God told Moses, "see, I have called by name Bezalel."

Rabbi Joḥanan taught that God proclaims three things for God's Self: famine, plenty, and a good leader. 2 Kings 8:1 shows that God proclaims famine, when it says: "The Lord has called for a famine." Ezekiel 36:29 shows that God proclaims plenty, when it says: "I will call for the corn and will increase it." And Exodus 31:1–2 shows that God proclaims a good leader, when it says: "And the Lord spoke to Moses, saying, 'See I have called by name Bezalel, the son of Uri.'" Rabbi Isaac taught that we cannot appoint a leader over a community without first consulting the people, as Exodus 35:30 says: "And Moses said to the children of Israel: 'See, the Lord has called by name Bezalel, the son of Uri.'" Rabbi Isaac taught that God asked Moses whether Moses considered Bezalel suitable. Moses replied that if God thought Bezalel suitable, surely Moses must also. God told Moses that, all the same, Moses should go and consult the people. Moses then asked the Israelites whether they considered Bezalel suitable. They replied that if God and Moses considered Bezalel suitable, then surely, they had to, as well. Rabbi Samuel bar Naḥmani said in the name of Rabbi Joḥanan that Bezalel ((בְּצַלְאֵל, whose name can be read (בְּצֵל אֶל, betzel El, "in the shadow of God") was so called because of his wisdom. When God told Moses (in Exodus 31:7) to tell Bezalel to make a tabernacle, an ark, and vessels, Moses reversed the order and told Bezalel to make an ark, vessels, and a tabernacle. Bezalel replied to Moses that as a rule, one first builds a house and then brings vessels into it, but Moses directed to make an ark, vessels, and a tabernacle. Bezalel asked where he would put the vessels. And Bezalel asked whether God had told Moses to make a tabernacle, an ark, and vessels. Moses replied that perhaps Bezalel had been in the shadow of God ((בְּצֵל אֶל, betzel El) and had thus come to know this. Rav Judah taught in the name of Rav that Exodus 35:31 indicated that God endowed Bezalel with the same attribute that God used in creating the universe. Rav Judah said in the name of Rav that Bezalel knew how to combine the letters by which God created the heavens and earth. For Exodus 35:31 says (about Bezalel), "And He has filled him with the spirit of God, in wisdom and in understanding, and in knowledge," and Proverbs 3:19 says (about creation), "The Lord by wisdom founded the earth; by understanding He established the heavens," and Proverbs 3:20 says, "By His knowledge the depths were broken up."

Rabbi Tanḥuma taught in the name of Rav Huna that even the things that Bezalel did not hear from Moses he conceived of on his own exactly as they were told to Moses from Sinai. Rabbi Tanḥuma said in the name of Rav Huna that one can deduce this from the words of Exodus 38:22, "And Bezalel the son of Uri, the son of Hur, of the tribe of Judah, made all that the Lord commanded Moses." For Exodus 38:22 does not say, "that Moses commanded him," but "that the Lord commanded Moses."

And the Agadat Shir ha-Shirim taught that Bezalel and Oholiab went up Mount Sinai, where the heavenly Sanctuary was shown to them.

Tractate Shabbat in the Mishnah, Tosefta, Jerusalem Talmud, and Babylonian Talmud interpreted the laws of the Sabbath in Exodus 16:23 and 29; 20:8–11; 23:12; 31:13–17; 35:2–3; Leviticus 19:3; 23:3; Numbers 15:32–36; and Deuteronomy 5:12.

Reading the words "everyone who profanes [the Sabbath] shall surely be put to death" in Exodus 31:14 (in which the verb for death is doubled), Samuel deduced that the Torah decreed many deaths for desecrating the Sabbath. The Gemara posited that perhaps Exodus 31:14 refers to willful desecration. The Gemara answered that Exodus 31:14 is not needed to teach that willful transgression of the Sabbath is a capital crime, for Exodus 35:2 says, "Whoever does any work therein shall be put to death." The Gemara concluded that Exodus 31:14 thus must apply to an unwitting offender, and in that context, the words "shall surely be put to death" mean that the inadvertent Sabbath violator will "die" monetarily because of the violator's need to bring costly sacrifices.

The Sifra taught that the incidents of the blasphemer in Leviticus 24:11–16 and the wood gatherer in Numbers 15:32–36 happened at the same time, but the Israelites did not leave the blasphemer with the wood gatherer, for they knew that the wood gatherer was going to be executed, as Exodus 31:14 directed, "those who profane it [the Sabbath] shall be put to death." But they did not know the correct form of death penalty for him, for God had not yet been specified what to do to him, as Numbers 15:34 says, "for it had not [yet] been specified what should be done to him." With regard to the blasphemer, the Sifra read Leviticus 24:12, "until the decision of the Lord should be made clear to them," to indicate that they did not know whether or not the blasphemer was to be executed. (And if they placed the blasphemer together with the wood gatherer, it might have caused the blasphemer unnecessary fear, as he might have concluded that he was on death row. Therefore, they held the two separately.)

A midrash asked to which commandment Deuteronomy 11:22 refers when it says, "For if you shall diligently keep all this commandment that I command you, to do it, to love the Lord your God, to walk in all His ways, and to cleave to Him, then will the Lord drive out all these nations from before you, and you shall dispossess nations greater and mightier than yourselves." Rabbi Levi said that "this commandment" refers to the recitation of the Shema (Deuteronomy 6:4–9), but the Rabbis said that it refers to the Sabbath, which is equal to all the precepts of the Torah.

The Alphabet of Rabbi Akiva taught that when God was giving Israel the Torah, God told them that if they accepted the Torah and observed God's commandments, then God would give them for eternity a most precious thing that God possessed—the World To Come. When Israel asked to see in this world an example of the World To Come, God replied that the Sabbath is an example of the World To Come.

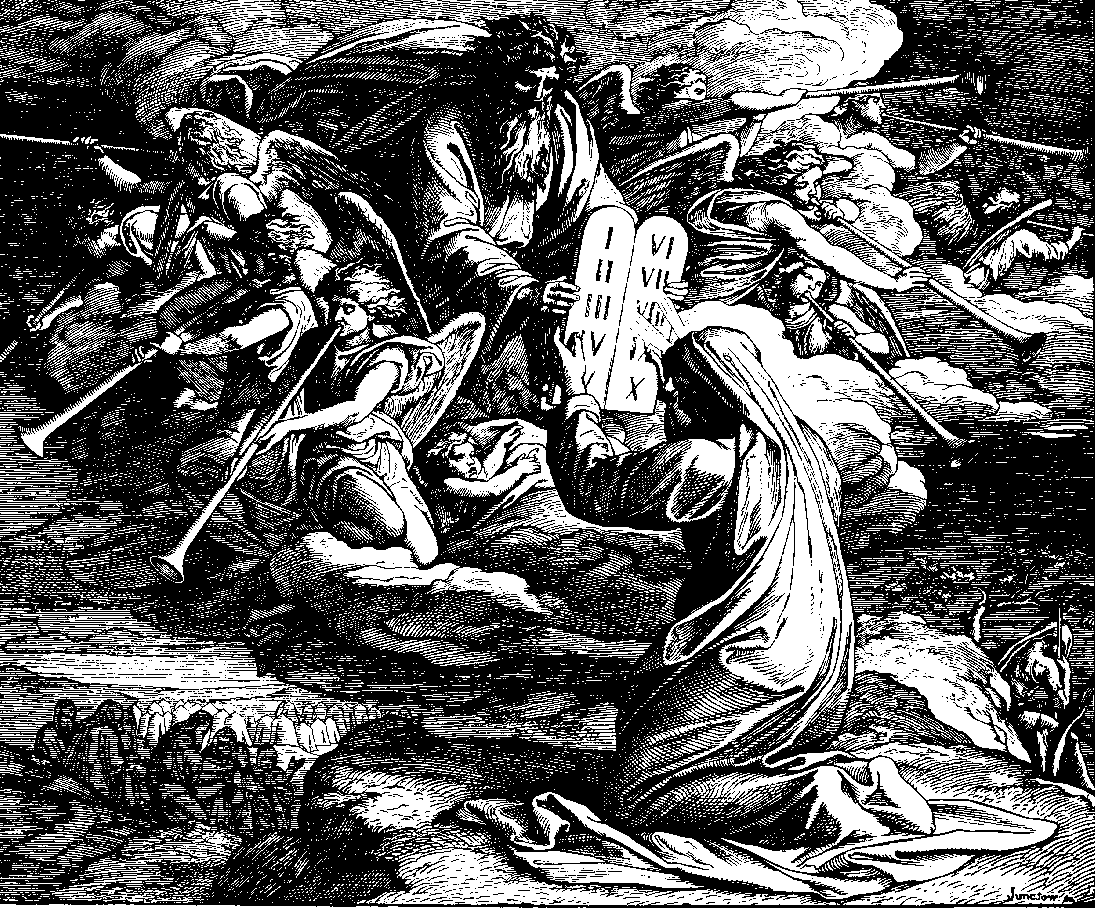
Moses Receives God's Holy Commandments (woodcut by Julius Schnorr von Carolsfeld from the 1860 Die Bibel in Bildern)

The Mishnah taught that the two tablets of the Ten Commandments that God gave Moses in Exodus 31:18 were among ten things that God created on the eve of the first Sabbath at twilight.

Rabbi Meir taught that the stone tablets that God gave Moses in Exodus 31:18 were each 6 handbreadths long, 6 handbreadths wide, and 3 handbreadths thick.

Rabbi Simeon ben Lakish (Resh Lakish) taught that the Torah that God gave Moses was of white fire and its writing of black fire. It was itself fire and it was hewn out of fire and completely formed of fire and given in fire, as Deuteronomy 33:2 says, "At His right hand was a fiery law to them."

Rabbi Samuel bar Naḥman taught that when God passed the two tablets to Moses (as reported in Exodus 31:18), the tablets conveyed to Moses a lustrous appearance (as reported in Exodus 34:30).

Rabbi Eleazar taught that from the words of Exodus 31:18, "tablets ((לֻחֹת, luchot) of stone," one may learn that if one regards one's cheeks ((לְחָיָיו, lechayav) as stone that is not easily worn away (constantly speaking words of Torah, regardless of the strain on one's facial muscles), one's learning will be preserved, but otherwise it will not.

Reading "the finger of God" in Exodus 31:18, Rabbi Ishmael said that each of the five fingers of God's right hand appertain to the mystery of Redemption. Rabbi Ishmael said that God wrote the tablets of the Law with the middle finger, as Exodus 31:18 says, "And He gave to Moses, when He had made an end of communing with him . . . tables of stone, written with the finger of God."

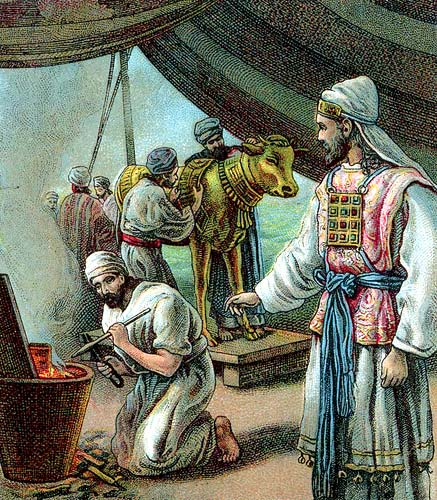
The Golden Calf (illustration from a Bible card published 1907 by the Providence Lithograph Company)

=== Exodus chapter 32 ===
A baraita taught that because of God's displeasure with the Israelites, the north wind did not blow on them in any of the 40 years during which they wandered in the wilderness.

Rabbi Tanḥum bar Hanilai taught that Aaron made the Golden Calf in Exodus 32:4 as a compromise with the people's demand in Exodus 32:1 to "make us a god who shall go before us." Rabbi Benjamin bar Japhet, reporting Rabbi Eleazar, interpreted the words of Exodus 32:5, "And when Aaron saw it, he built an altar before it," to mean that Aaron saw (his nephew) Hur lying slain before him and thought that if he did not obey the people, they would kill him as well. (Exodus 24:14 mentions that Moses appointed Hur to share the leadership of the people with Aaron, but after Moses descended from Mount Sinai, Hur's name does not appear again.) Aaron thought that the people would then fulfill the words of Lamentations 2:20, "Shall the Priest and the Prophet be slain in the Sanctuary of God?" and the people would then never find forgiveness. Aaron thought it better to let the people worship the Golden Calf, for which they might yet find forgiveness through repentance. And thus Rabbi Tanḥum bar Hanilai concluded that it was in reference to Aaron's decision-making in this incident that Psalm 10:3 can be read to mean, "He who praises one who makes a compromise blasphemes God."

The Sages told that Aaron really intended to delay the people until Moses came down, but when Moses saw Aaron beating the Golden Calf into shape with a hammer, Moses thought that Aaron was participating in the sin and was incensed with him. So God told Moses that God knew that Aaron's intentions were good. The midrash compared it to a prince who became mentally unstable and started digging to undermine his father's house. His tutor told him not to weary himself but to let him dig. When the king saw it, he said that he knew the tutor's intentions were good and declared that the tutor would rule over the palace. Similarly, when the Israelites told Aaron in Exodus 32:1, "Make us a god," Aaron replied in Exodus 32:1, "Break off the golden rings that are in the ears of your wives, of your sons, and of your daughters, and bring them to me." And Aaron told them that since he was a priest, they should let him make it and sacrifice to it, all with the intention of delaying them until Moses could come down. So God told Aaron that God knew Aaron's intention, and that only Aaron would have sovereignty over the sacrifices that the Israelites would bring. Hence in Exodus 28:1, God told Moses, "And bring near Aaron your brother, and his sons with him, from among the children of Israel, that they may minister to Me in the priest's office." The midrash told that God told this to Moses several months later in the Tabernacle itself when Moses was about to consecrate Aaron to his office. Rabbi Levi compared it to the friend of a king who was a member of the imperial cabinet and a judge. When the king was about to appoint a palace governor, he told his friend that he intended to appoint the friend's brother. So God made Moses superintendent of the palace, as Numbers 7:7 reports, "My servant Moses is . . . is trusted in all My house," and God made Moses a judge, as Exodus 18:13 reports, "Moses sat to judge the people." And when God was about to appoint a High Priest, God notified Moses that it would be his brother Aaron.

A midrash noted that in the incident of the Golden Calf, in Exodus 32:2, Aaron told them, "Break off the golden rings that are in the ears of your wives," but the women refused to participate, as Exodus 32:3 indicates when it says, "And all the people broke off the golden rings that were in their ears." Similarly, the midrash noted that Numbers 14:36 says that in the incident of the spies, "the men . . . when they returned, made all the congregation to murmur against him." The midrash explained that that is why the report of Numbers 27:1–11 about the daughters of Zelophehad follows immediately after the report of Numbers 26:65 about the death of the wilderness generation. The midrash noted that Numbers 26:65 says, "there was not left a man of them, save Caleb the son of Jephunneh," because the men had been unwilling to enter the Land. But the midrash taught that Numbers 27:1 says, "then drew near the daughters of Zelophehad," to show that the women still sought an inheritance in the Land. The midrash taught that in that generation, the women built up fences that the men broke down.

The Pirke De-Rabbi Eliezer expounded on the exchange between God and Moses in Exodus 32:7–14 after the sin of the Golden Calf. The Pirke De-Rabbi Eliezer told that after the incident of the Golden Calf, God told Moses that the Israelites had forgotten God's might and had made an idol. Moses replied to God that while the Israelites had not yet sinned, God had called them "My people," as in Exodus 7:4, God had said, "And I will bring forth My hosts, My people." But Moses noted that once the Israelites had sinned, God told Moses (in Exodus 32:7), "Go, get down, for your people have corrupted themselves." Moses told God that the Israelites were indeed God's people, and God's inheritance, as Deuteronomy 9:29 reports Moses saying, "Yet they are Your people and Your inheritance."

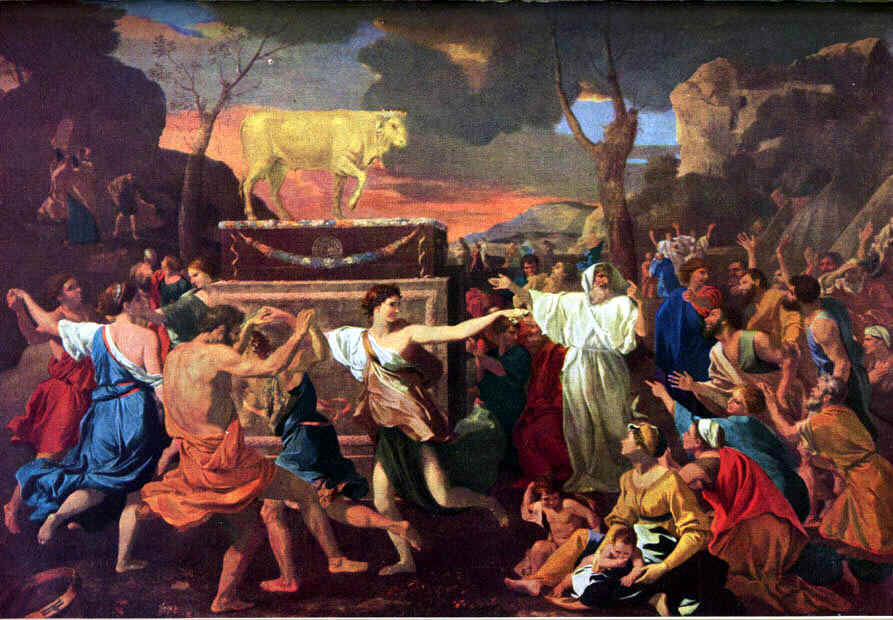
The Adoration of the Golden Calf (painting circa 1633–1634 by Nicolas Poussin)

The Avot of Rabbi Natan read the listing of places in Deuteronomy 1:1 to allude to how God tested the Israelites with ten trials in the Wilderness, and they failed them all. The words "In the wilderness" alludes to the Golden Calf, as Exodus 32:8 reports. "On the plain" alludes to how they complained about not having water, as Exodus 17:3 reports. "Facing Suf" alludes to how they rebelled at the Sea of Reeds (or some say to the idol that Micah made). Rabbi Judah cited Psalms 106:7, "They rebelled at the Sea of Reeds." "Between Paran" alludes to the Twelve Spies, as Numbers 13:3 says, "Moses sent them from the wilderness of Paran." "And Tophel" alludes to the frivolous words (תפלות, tiphlot) they said about the manna. "Lavan" alludes to Koraḥ's mutiny. "Ḥatzerot" alludes to the quails. And in Deuteronomy 9:22, it says, "At Tav'erah, and at Masah, and at Kivrot HaTa'avah." And "Di-zahav" alludes to when Aaron said to them: "Enough (דַּי, dai) of this golden (זָהָב, zahav) sin that you have committed with the Calf!" But Rabbi Eliezer ben Ya'akov said it means "Terrible enough (דַּי, dai) is this sin that Israel was punished to last from now until the resurrection of the dead." Similarly, the school of Rabbi Yannai interpreted the place name Di-zahab (דִי זָהָב) in Deuteronomy 1:1 to refer to one of the Israelites' sins that Moses recounted in the opening of his address. The school of Rabbi Yannai deduced from the word Di-zahab that Moses spoke insolently towards heaven. The school of Rabbi Yannai taught that Moses told God that it was because of the silver and gold (זָהָב, zahav) that God showered on the Israelites until they said "Enough" (דַּי, dai) that the Israelites made the Golden Calf. They said in the school of Rabbi Yannai that a lion does not roar with excitement over a basket of straw but over a basket of meat. Rabbi Oshaia likened it to the case of a man who had a lean but large-limbed cow. The man gave the cow good feed to eat, and the cow started kicking him. The man deduced that it was feeding the cow good feed that caused the cow to kick him. Rabbi Hiyya bar Abba likened it to the case of a man who had a son and bathed him, anointed him, gave him plenty to eat and drink, hung a purse round his neck, and set him down at the door of a brothel. How could the boy help sinning? Rav Aha the son of Rav Huna said in the name of Rav Sheshet that this bears out the popular saying that a full stomach leads to a bad impulse. As Hosea 13:6 says, "When they were fed they became full, they were filled and their heart was exalted; therefore they have forgotten Me."

Did the prayer of Moses in Exodus 32:11–14 change God's harsh decree? On this subject, Rabbi Abbahu interpreted David's last words, as reported in 2 Samuel 23:2–3, where David reported that God told him, "Ruler over man shall be the righteous, even he that rules through the fear of God." Rabbi Abbahu read 2 Samuel 23:2–3 to teach that God rules humankind, but the righteous rule God, for God makes a decree, and the righteous may through their prayer annul it.

Rava employed Numbers 30:3 to interpret Exodus 32:11, which says: "And Moses besought (va-yechal) the Lord his God" in connection with the incident of the Golden Calf. Rava noted that Exodus 32:11 uses the term "besought" (va-yechal), while Numbers 30:3 uses the similar term "break" (yachel) in connection with vows. Transferring the use of Numbers 30:3 to Exodus 32:11, Rava reasoned that Exodus 32:11 meant that Moses stood in prayer before God until Moses annulled for God God's vow to destroy Israel, for a master had taught that while people cannot break their vows, others may annul their vows for them. Similarly, Rabbi Berekiah taught in the name of Rabbi Helbo in the name of Rabbi Isaac that Moses absolved God of God's vow. When the Israelites made the Golden Calf, Moses began to persuade God to forgive them, but God explained to Moses that God had already taken an oath in Exodus 22:19 that "he who sacrifices to the gods . . . shall be utterly destroyed," and God could not retract an oath. Moses responded by asking whether God had not granted Moses the power to annul oaths in Numbers 30:3 by saying, "When a man vows a vow to the Lord, or swears an oath to bind his soul with a bond, he shall not break his word," implying that while he himself could not break his word, a scholar could absolve his vow. So Moses wrapped himself in his cloak and adopted the posture of a sage, and God stood before Moses as one asking for the annulment of a vow.

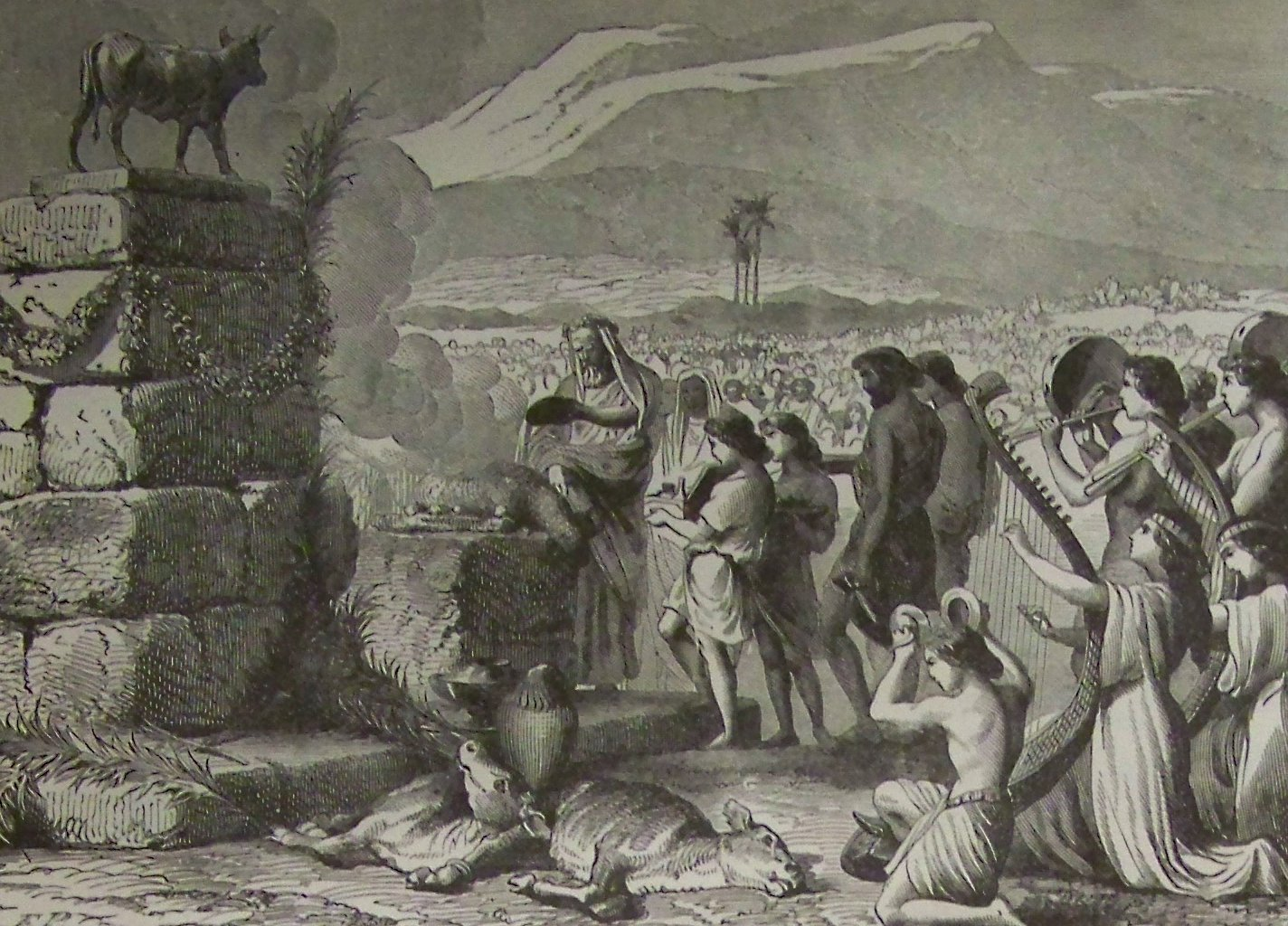
The Golden Calf (illustration from the 1890 Holman Bible)

The Gemara deduced from the example of Moses in Exodus 32:11. that one should seek an interceding frame of mind before praying. Rav Huna and Rav Ḥisda were discussing how long to wait between recitations of the Amidah prayer if one erred in the first reciting and needed to repeat the prayer. One said: long enough for the person praying to fall into a suppliant frame of mind, citing the words "And I supplicated the Lord" in Deuteronomy 3:23. The other said: long enough to fall into an interceding frame of mind, citing the words "And Moses interceded" in Exodus 32:11.

A midrash compared Noah to Moses and found Moses superior. While Noah was worthy to be delivered from the generation of the Flood, he saved only himself and his family, and had insufficient strength to deliver his generation. Moses, however, saved both himself and his generation when they were condemned to destruction after the sin of the Golden Calf, as Exodus 32:14 reports, "And the Lord repented of the evil that He said He would do to His people." The midrash compared the cases to two ships in danger on the high seas, on board of which were two pilots. One saved himself but not his ship, and the other saved both himself and his ship.

Interpreting Exodus 32:15 on the "tablets that were written on both their sides," Rav Ḥisda said that the writing of the tablets was cut completely through the tablets, so that it could be read from either side. Thus the letters mem and samekh, which each form a complete polygon, left some of the stone tablets in the middle of those letters standing in the air where they were held stable only by a miracle.

Rabbi Samuel bar Naḥman told that when the Israelites exclaimed, "This is your God, O Israel" in Exodus 32:4, Moses was just then descending from Mount Sinai. Joshua told Moses (in Exodus 32:17), "There is a noise of war in the camp." But Moses retorted (in Exodus 32:18), "It is not the voice of them that shout for mastery; neither is it the voice of them that cry for being overcome, but the noise of them that sing do I hear." Rabbi Samuel bar Naḥman interpreted the words, "but the noise of them that sing do I hear," to mean that Moses heard the noise of reproach and blasphemy. The men of the Great Assembly noted that Nehemiah 9:18 reports, "They had made a molten calf, and said: 'This is your God that brought you up out of Egypt.'" That would be sufficient provocation, but Nehemiah 9:18 continues, "And wrought great provocations." The men of the Great Assembly thus concluded that Nehemiah 9:18 demonstrates that in addition to making the Golden Calf, on that occasion the Israelites also uttered reproaches and blasphemy.

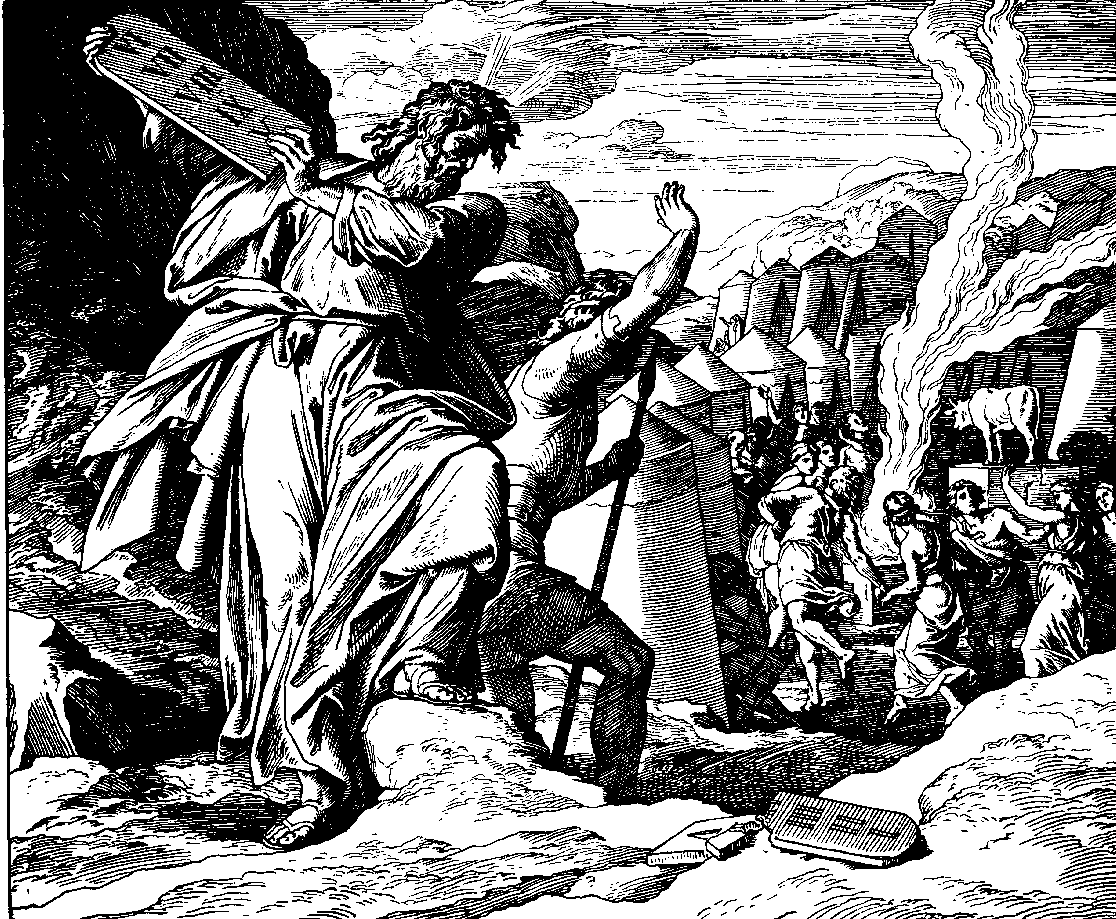
The Idolatry of the Golden Calf (woodcut by Julius Schnorr von Carolsfeld from the 1860 Die Bibel in Bildern)

A midrash explained why Moses broke the stone tablets. When the Israelites committed the sin of the Golden Calf, God sat in judgment to condemn them, as Deuteronomy 9:14 says, "Let Me alone, that I may destroy them," but God had not yet condemned them. So Moses took the tablets from God to appease God's wrath. The midrash compared the act of Moses to that of a king's marriage-broker. The king sent the broker to secure a wife for the king, but while the broker was on the road, the woman corrupted herself with another man. The broker (who was entirely innocent) took the marriage document that the king had given the broker to seal the marriage and tore it, reasoning that it would be better for the woman to be judged as an unmarried woman than as a wife.

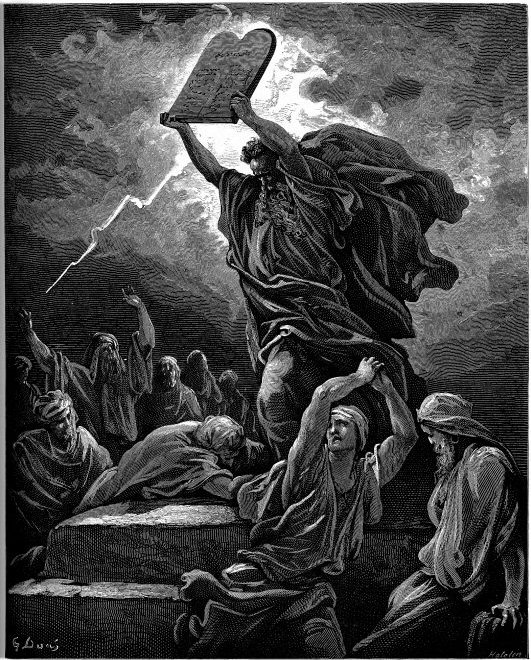
Moses Smashing the Tables of the Law (illustration by Gustave Doré)

Rabbi Eleazar taught that one could learn from the words of Exodus 32:16, "carved on the tablets," that if the first two tablets had not been broken, the Torah would have remained carved forever, and the Torah would never have been forgotten in Israel. Rav Aha bar Jacob said that no nation or tongue would have had any power over Israel, as one can read the word "carved" ((חָרוּת, charut) in Exodus 32:16 as "freedom" ((חֵרוּת, cheirut). (Thus, for the sake of the original two tablets, Israel would have remained forever free.)

A baraita taught that when Moses broke the tablets in Exodus 32:19, it was one of three actions that Moses took based on his own understanding with which God then agreed. The Gemara explained that Moses reasoned that if the Passover lamb, which was just one of the 613 commandments, was prohibited by Exodus 12:43 to aliens, then certainly the whole Torah should be prohibited to the Israelites, who had acted as apostates with the Golden Calf. The Gemara deduced God's approval from God's mention of Moses' breaking the tablets in Exodus 34:1. Resh Lakish interpreted this to mean that God gave Moses strength because he broke the tablets.

A midrash taught that in recompense for Moses having grown angry and breaking the first set of tablets in Exodus 32:19, God imposed on Moses the job of carving the second set of two tablets in Deuteronomy 10:1.

The Rabbis taught that Exodus 32:19 and Deuteronomy 10:1 bear out Ecclesiastes 3:5, "A time to cast away stones, and a time to gather stones together." The Rabbis taught that Ecclesiastes 3:5 refers to Moses. For there was a time for Moses to cast away the tablets in Exodus 32:19, and a time for him to restore them to Israel in Deuteronomy 10:1.

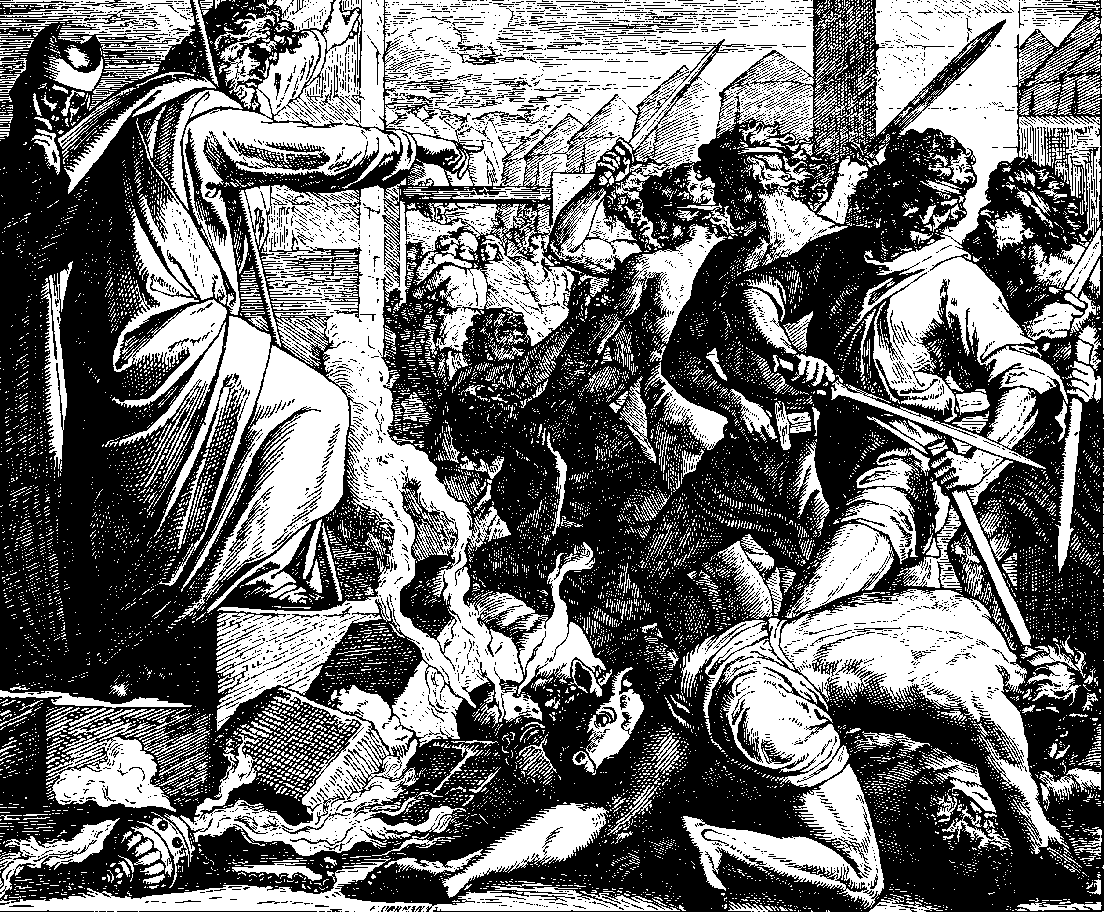
Destruction of the Golden Calf (woodcut by Julius Schnorr von Carolsfeld from the 1860 Die Bibel in Bildern)

Reading the report of Exodus 32:20 that Moses "took the calf . . . ground it to powder, and sprinkled it on the water, and made the children of Israel drink it," the Sages interpreted that Moses meant to test the Israelites much as the procedure of Numbers 5:11–31 tested a wife accused of adultery (sotah).

The Rabbis taught that through the word "this," Aaron became degraded, as it is said in Exodus 32:22–24, "And Aaron said: '. . . I cast it into the fire, and there came out this calf,'" and through the word "this," Aaron was also elevated, as it is said in Leviticus 6:13, "This is the offering of Aaron and of his sons, which they shall offer to the Lord on the day when he is anointed" to become High Priest.

A midrash noted that Israel sinned with fire in making the Golden Calf, as Exodus 32:24 says, "And I cast it into the fire, and there came out this calf." And then Bezalel came and healed the wound (and the construction of the Tabernacle made atonement for the sins of the people in making the Golden Calf). The midrash likened it to the words of Isaiah 54:16, "Behold, I have created the smith who blows the fire of coals." The midrash taught that Bezalel was the smith whom God had created to address the fire. And the midrash likened it to the case of a doctor's disciple who applied a plaster to a wound and healed it. When people began to praise him, his teacher, the doctor, said that they should praise the doctor, for he taught the disciple. Similarly, when everybody said that Bezalel had constructed the Tabernacle through his knowledge and understanding, God said that it was God who created him and taught him, as Isaiah 54:16 says, "Behold, I have created the smith." Thus Moses said in Exodus 35:30, "see, the Lord has called by name Bezalel."

Rav Naḥman bar Isaac derived from the words "if not, blot me, I pray, out of Your book that You have written" in Exodus 32:32 that three books are opened in heaven on Rosh Hashanah. Rav Kruspedai said in the name of Rabbi Joḥanan that on Rosh Hashanah, three books are opened in Heaven—one for the thoroughly wicked, one for the thoroughly righteous, and one for those in between. The thoroughly righteous are immediately inscribed definitively in the book of life. The thoroughly wicked are immediately inscribed definitively in the book of death. And the fate of those in between is suspended from Rosh Hashanah to Yom Kippur. If they deserve well, then they are inscribed in the book of life; if they do not deserve well, then they are inscribed in the book of death. Rabbi Abin said that Psalm 69:29 tells us this when it says, "Let them be blotted out of the book of the living, and not be written with the righteous." "Let them be blotted out from the book" refers to the book of the wicked. "Of the living" refers to the book of the righteous. "And not be written with the righteous" refers to the book of those in between. Rav Naḥman bar Isaac derived this from Exodus 32:32, where Moses told God, "if not, blot me, I pray, out of Your book that You have written." "Blot me, I pray" refers to the book of the wicked. "Out of Your book" refers to the book of the righteous. "That you have written" refers to the book of those in between. A baraita taught that the House of Shammai said that there will be three groups at the Day of Judgment—one of thoroughly righteous, one of thoroughly wicked, and one of those in between. The thoroughly righteous will immediately be inscribed definitively as entitled to everlasting life; the thoroughly wicked will immediately be inscribed definitively as doomed to Gehinnom, as Daniel 12:2 says, "And many of them who sleep in the dust of the earth shall awake, some to everlasting life and some to reproaches and everlasting abhorrence." Those in between will go down to Gehinnom and scream and rise again, as Zechariah 13:9 says, "And I will bring the third part through the fire, and will refine them as silver is refined, and will try them as gold is tried. They shall call on My name and I will answer them." Of them, Hannah said in 1 Samuel 2:6, "The Lord kills and makes alive, He brings down to the grave and brings up." Reading the description of God in Exodus 34:6 as "abundant in kindness," the House of Hillel taught that God inclines the scales towards grace (so that those in between do not have to descend to Gehinnom), and of them David said in Psalm 116:1–3, "I love that the Lord should hear my voice and my supplication . . . The cords of death compassed me, and the straits of the netherworld got hold upon me," and on their behalf David composed the conclusion of Psalm 116:6, "I was brought low and He saved me."

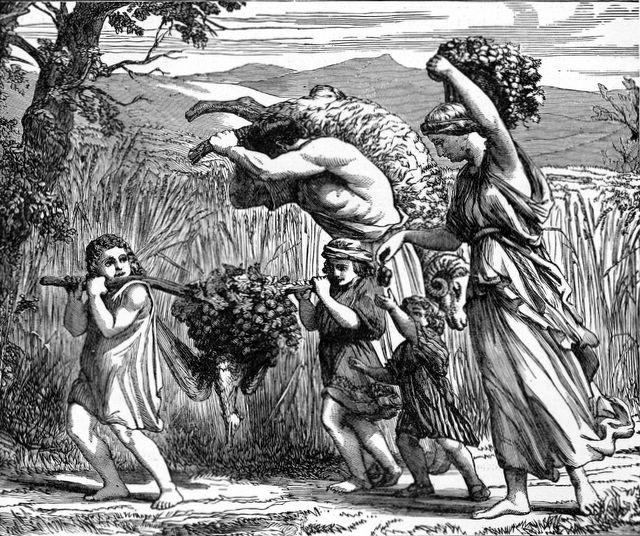
A Land Flowing with Milk and Honey (illustration from Henry Davenport Northrop's 1894 Treasures of the Bible)

=== Exodus chapter 33 ===
Reading Exodus 24:3, Rabbi Simlai taught that when the Israelites gave precedence to "we will do" over "we will hear," 600,000 ministering angels came and set two crowns on each Israelite man, one as a reward for "we will do" and the other as a reward for "we will hearken." But as soon as the Israelites committed the sin of the Golden Calf, 1.2 million destroying angels descended and removed the crowns, as it is said in Exodus 33:6, "And the children of Israel stripped themselves of their ornaments from mount Horeb."

The Gemara reported a number of Rabbis' reports of how the Land of Israel did indeed flow with "milk and honey," as described in Exodus 3:8 and 17, 13:5, and 33:3, Leviticus 20:24, Numbers 13:27 and 14:8, and Deuteronomy 6:3, 11:9, 26:9 and 15, 27:3, and 31:20. Once when Rami bar Ezekiel visited Bnei Brak, he saw goats grazing under fig trees while honey was flowing from the figs, and milk dripped from the goats mingling with the fig honey, causing him to remark that it was indeed a land flowing with milk and honey. Rabbi Jacob ben Dostai said that it is about three miles from Lod to Ono, and once he rose up early in the morning and waded all that way up to his ankles in fig honey. Resh Lakish said that he saw the flow of the milk and honey of Sepphoris extend over an area of sixteen miles by sixteen miles. Rabbah bar Bar Hana said that he saw the flow of the milk and honey in all the Land of Israel and the total area was equal to an area of twenty-two parasangs by six parasangs.

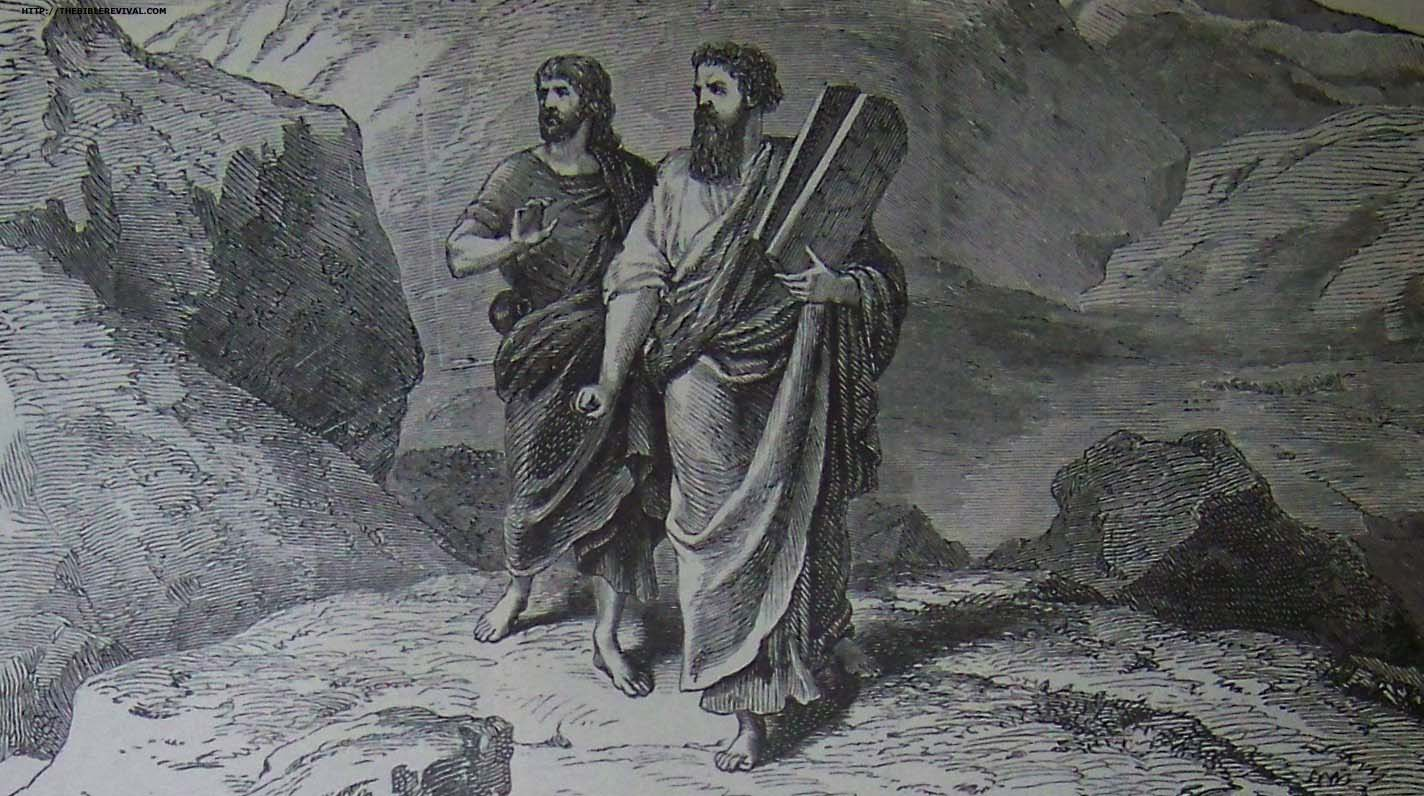
Moses and Joshua Bearing the Law (illustration from the 1890 Holman Bible)

Rav Judah taught in the name of Rav that as Moses was dying, Joshua quoted back to Moses the report of Exodus 33:11 about how Joshua stood by the side of Moses all the time. Rav Judah reported in the name of Rav that when Moses was dying, he invited Joshua to ask him about any doubts that Joshua might have. Joshua replied by asking Moses whether Joshua had ever left Moses for an hour and gone elsewhere. Joshua asked Moses whether Moses had not written in Exodus 33:11, "The Lord would speak to Moses face to face, as one man speaks to another. . . . But his servant Joshua the son of Nun departed not out of the Tabernacle." Joshua's words wounded Moses, and immediately the strength of Moses waned, and Joshua forgot 300 laws, and 700 doubts concerning laws arose in Joshua's mind. The Israelites then arose to kill Joshua (unless he could resolve these doubts). God then told Joshua that it was not possible to tell him the answers (for, as Deuteronomy 30:11–12 tells, the Torah is not in Heaven). Instead, God then directed Joshua to occupy the Israelites' attention in war, as Joshua 1:1–2 reports.

Rabbi Samuel bar Naḥmani taught in the name of Rabbi Jonathan that the report of Exodus 33:11 helped to illuminate the words of Joshua 1:8 as a blessing. Ben Damah the son of Rabbi Ishmael's sister once asked Rabbi Ishmael whether one who had studied the whole Torah might learn Greek wisdom. Rabbi Ishmael replied by reading to Ben Damah Joshua 1:8, "This book of the law shall not depart out of your mouth, but you shall meditate therein day and night." And then Rabbi Ishmael told Ben Damah to go find a time that is neither day nor night and learn Greek wisdom then. Rabbi Samuel bar Naḥmani, however, taught in the name of Rabbi Jonathan that Joshua 1:8 is neither duty nor command, but a blessing. For God saw that the words of the Torah were most precious to Joshua, as Exodus 33:11 says, "The Lord would speak to Moses face to face, as one man speaks to another. And he would then return to the camp. His minister Joshua, the son of Nun, a young man, departed not out of the tent." So God told Joshua that since the words of the Torah were so precious to him, God assured Joshua (in the words of Joshua 1:8) that "this book of the law shall not depart out of your mouth." A baraita was taught in the School of Rabbi Ishmael, however, that one should not consider the words of the Torah as a debt that one should desire to discharge, for one is not at liberty to desist from them.

A midrash taught that Proverbs 27:18, "And he who waits on his master shall be honored," alludes to Joshua, for Joshua ministered to Moses day and night, as reported by Exodus 33:11, which says, "Joshua departed not out of the Tent," and Numbers 11:28, which says, "Joshua . . . said: 'My lord Moses, shut them in.'" Consequently, God honored Joshua by saying of Joshua in Numbers 27:21: "He shall stand before Eleazar the priest, who shall inquire for him by the judgment of the Urim." And because Joshua served his master Moses, Joshua attained the privilege of receiving the Holy Spirit, as Joshua 1:1 reports, "Now it came to pass after the death of Moses . . . that the Lord spoke to Joshua, the minister of Moses." The midrash taught that there was no need for Joshua 1:1 to state, "the minister of Moses," so the purpose of the statement "the minister of Moses" was to explain that Joshua was awarded the privilege of prophecy because he was the minister of Moses.

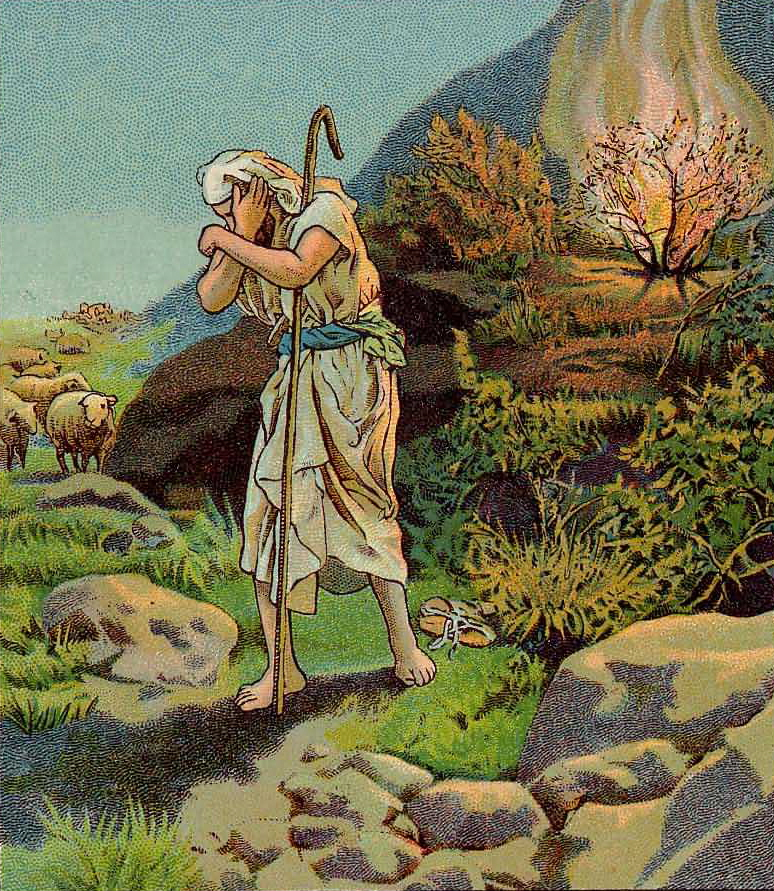
The Burning Bush (illustration from a Bible card published 1900 by the Providence Lithograph Company)

Rav Nachman taught that the angel of whom God spoke in Exodus 23:20 was Metatron ((מטטרון). Rav Naḥman warned that one who is as skilled in refuting heretics as Rav Idit should do so, but others should not. Once a heretic asked Rav Idit why Exodus 24:1 says, "And to Moses He said, 'Come up to the Lord,'" when surely God should have said, "Come up to Me." Rav Idit replied that it was the angel Metatron who said that, and that Metatron's name is similar to that of his Master (and indeed the gematria (numerical value of the Hebrew letters) of Metatron ((מטטרון) equals that of Shadai ((שַׁדַּי), God's name in Genesis 17:1 and elsewhere) for Exodus 23:21 says, "for my name is in him." But if so, the heretic retorted, we should worship Metatron. Rav Idit replied that Exodus 23:21 also says, "Be not rebellious against him," by which God meant, "Do not exchange Me for him" (as the word for "rebel," ((תַּמֵּר, tamer) derives from the same root as the word "exchange"). The heretic then asked why then Exodus 23:21 says, "he will not pardon your transgression." Rav Idit answered that indeed Metatron has no authority to forgive sins, and the Israelites would not accept him even as a messenger, for Exodus 33:15 reports that Moses told God, "If Your Presence does not go with me, do not carry us up from here."

A baraita taught in the name of Rabbi Joshua ben Korhah that God told Moses that when God wanted to be seen at the burning bush, Moses did not want to see God's face; Moses hid his face in Exodus 3:6, for he was afraid to look upon God. And then in Exodus 33:18, when Moses wanted to see God, God did not want to be seen; in Exodus 33:20, God said, "You cannot see My face." But Rabbi Samuel bar Naḥmani said in the name of Rabbi Jonathan that in compensation for three pious acts that Moses did at the burning bush, he was privileged to obtain three rewards. In reward for hiding his face in Exodus 3:6, his face shone in Exodus 34:29. In reward his fear of God in Exodus 3:6, the Israelites were afraid to come near him in Exodus 34:30. In reward for his reticence "to look upon God," he beheld the similitude of God in Numbers 12:8.

The Pirke De-Rabbi Eliezer told what happened in Exodus 33:18–34:6 after Moses asked to behold God's Presence in Exodus 33:18. Moses foretold that he would behold God's Glory and make atonement for the Israelites' iniquities on Yom Kippur. On that day, Moses asked God (in the words of Exodus 33:18) "Show me, I pray, Your Glory." God told Moses that Moses was not able to see God's Glory lest he die, as Exodus 33:20 reports God said, "men shall not see Me and live," but for the sake of God's oath to Moses, God agreed to do as Moses asked. God instructed Moses to stand at the entrance of a cave, and God would cause all God's angels to pass before Moses. God told Moses to stand his ground, and not to fear, as Exodus 33:19 reports, "And He said, I will make all My Goodness pass before you." God told Moses that when he heard the Name that God had spoken to him, then Moses would know that God was before him, as Exodus 33:19 reports. The ministering angels complained that they served before God day and night, and they were unable to see God's Glory, but this man Moses born of woman desired to see God's Glory. The angels arose in wrath and excitement to kill Moses, and he came near to death. God intervened in a cloud to protect Moses, as Exodus 34:5 reports, "And the Lord descended in the cloud." God protected Moses with the hollow of God's hand so that he would not die, as Exodus 33:22 reports, "And it shall come to pass, while My Glory passes by, that I will put you in a cleft of the rock, and I will cover you with My hand." When God had passed by, God removed the hollow of God's hand from Moses, and he saw traces of the Shechinah, as Exodus 33:23 says, "And I will take away My hand, and you shall see my back." Moses began to cry with a loud voice, and Moses said the words of Exodus 34:6–7: "O Lord, O Lord, a God full of compassion and gracious . . . ." Moses asked God to pardon the iniquities of the people in connection with the Golden Calf. God told Moses that if he had asked God then to pardon the iniquities of all Israel, even to the end of all generations, God would have done so, as it was the appropriate time. But Moses had asked for pardon with reference to the Golden Calf, so God told Moses that it would be according to his words, as Numbers 14:20 says, "And the Lord said, 'I have pardoned according to your word.'"

Rabbi Jose ben Halafta employed Exodus 33:21 to help explain how God can be called "the Place." Reading the words, "And he lighted upon the place," in Genesis 28:11 to mean, "And he met the Divine Presence (Shechinah)," Rav Huna asked in Rabbi Ammi's name why Genesis 28:11 assigns to God the name "the Place." Rav Huna explained that it is because God is the Place of the world (the world is contained in God, and not God in the world). Rabbi Jose ben Halafta taught that we do not know whether God is the place of God's world or whether God's world is God's place, but from Exodus 33:21, which says, "Behold, there is a place with Me," it follows that God is the place of God's world, but God's world is not God's place. Rabbi Isaac taught that reading Deuteronomy 33:27, "The eternal God is a dwelling place," one cannot know whether God is the dwelling-place of God's world or whether God's world is God's dwelling-place. But reading Psalm 90:1, "Lord, You have been our dwelling-place," it follows that God is the dwelling-place of God's world, but God's world is not God's dwelling-place. And Rabbi Abba ben Judan taught that God is like a warrior riding a horse with the warrior's robes flowing over on both sides of the horse. The horse is subsidiary to the rider, but the rider is not subsidiary to the horse. Thus Habakkuk 3:8 says, "You ride upon Your horses, upon Your chariots of victory."

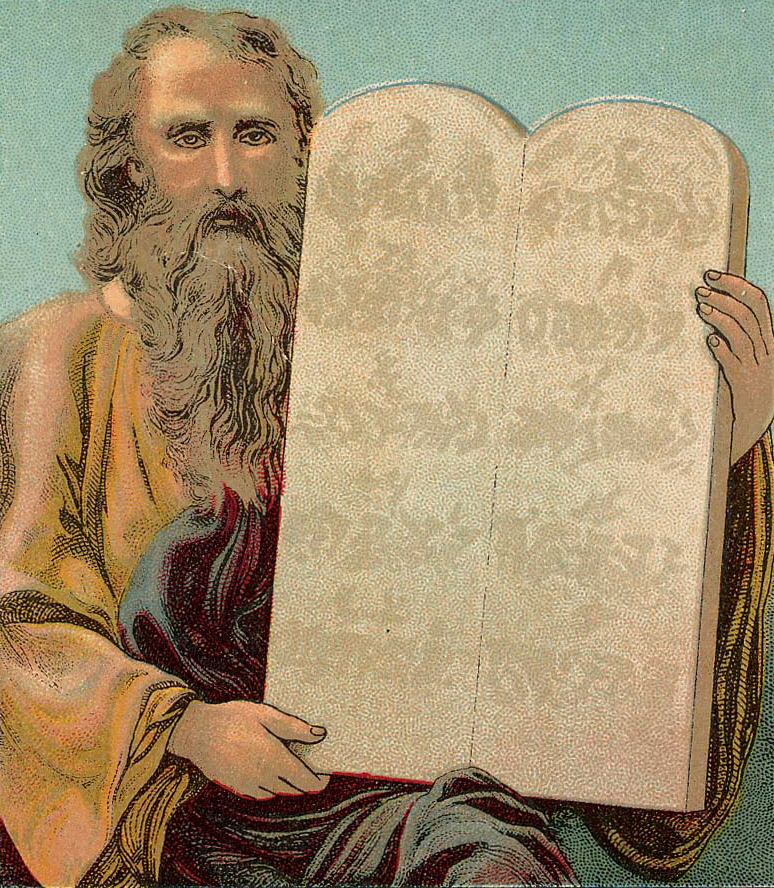
The Tablets of the Ten Commandments (illustration from a Bible card published 1907 by the Providence Lithograph Company)

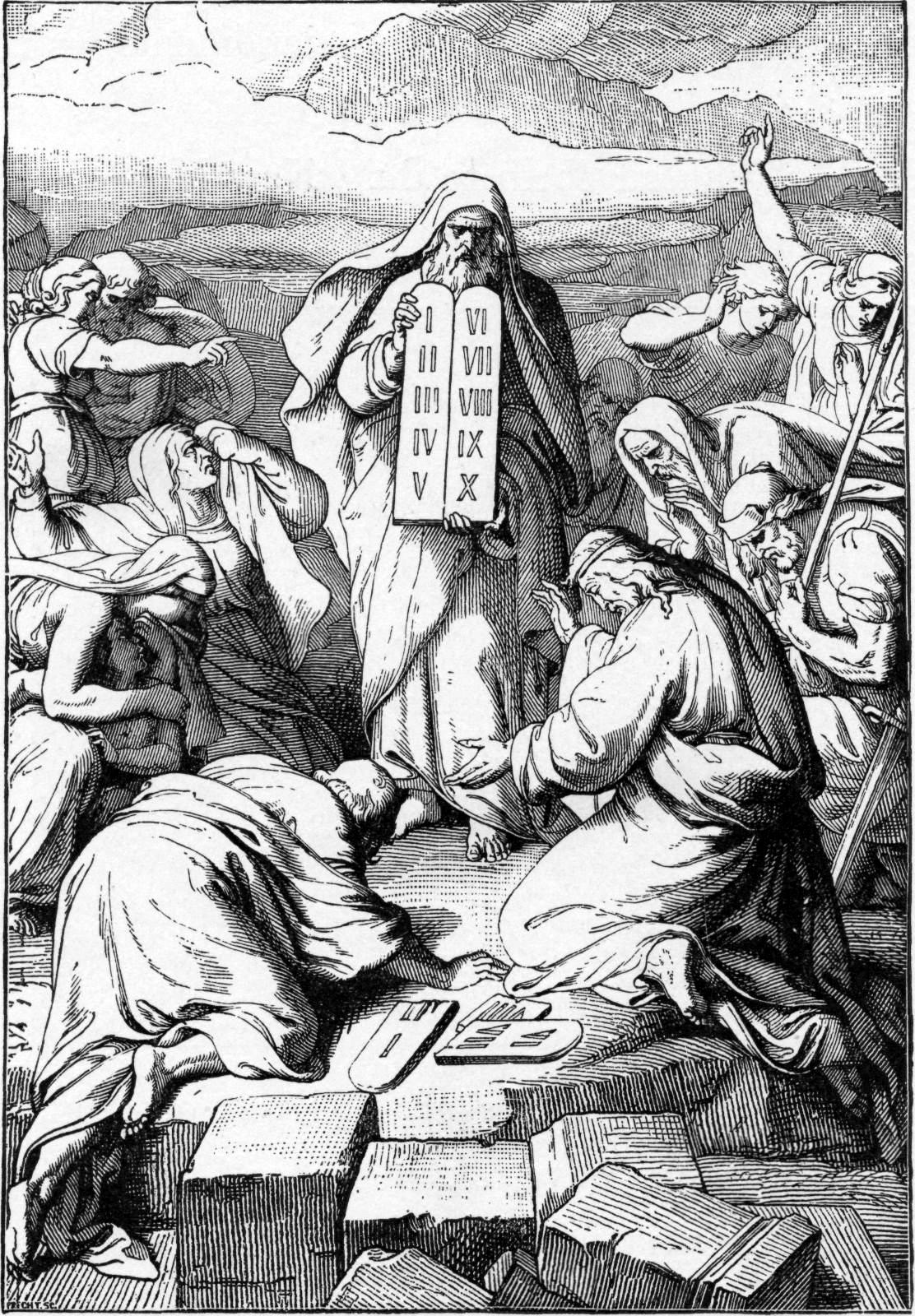
Moses with the Two New Tables of Stone (illustration from the 1897 Bible Pictures and What They Teach Us by Charles Foster)

=== Exodus chapter 34 ===
Rabban Joḥanan ben Zakkai explained why God carved the first two tablets but instructed Moses to carve the second two in Exodus 34:1. Rabban Joḥanan ben Zakkai compared it to the case of a king who took a wife and paid for the paper for the marriage contract, the scribe, and the wedding dress. But when he saw her cavorting with one of his servants, he became angry with her and sent her away. Her agent came to the king and argued that she had been raised among servants and was thus familiar with them. The king told the agent that if he wished that the king should become reconciled with her, the agent should pay for the paper and the scribe for a new wedding contract and the king would sign it. Similarly, when Moses spoke to God after the Israelites committed the sin of the Golden Calf, Moses argued that God knew that God had brought the Israelites out of Egypt, a house of idolatry. God answered that if Moses desired that God should become reconciled with the Israelites, then Moses would have to bring the tablets at his own expense, and God would append God's signature, as God says in Exodus 34:1, "And I will write upon the tablets."

In Deuteronomy 18:15, Moses foretold that "A prophet will the Lord your God raise up for you . . . like me," and Rabbi Joḥanan thus taught that prophets would have to be, like Moses, strong, wealthy, wise, and meek. Strong, for Exodus 40:19 says of Moses, "he spread the tent over the tabernacle," and a Master taught that Moses himself spread it, and Exodus 26:16 reports, "Ten cubits shall be the length of a board." Similarly, the strength of Moses can be derived from Deuteronomy 9:17, in which Moses reports, "And I took the two tablets, and cast them out of my two hands, and broke them," and it was taught that the tablets were six handbreadths in length, six in breadth, and three in thickness. Wealthy, as Exodus 34:1 reports God's instruction to Moses, "Carve yourself two tablets of stone," and the Rabbis interpreted the verse to teach that the chips would belong to Moses. Wise, for Rav and Samuel both said that 50 gates of understanding were created in the world, and all but one were given to Moses, for Psalm 8:6 said of Moses, "You have made him a little lower than God." Meek, for Numbers 12:3 reports, "Now the man Moses was very meek."

The Gemara taught that both the tablets of the Covenant and the broken tablets were placed in the Ark of the Covenant in the Temple. Even though the first tablets were broken, their sanctity obligated the Israelites to treat them respectfully. Rabbi Joshua ben Levi further taught that an elder who forgot the Torah knowledge that the elder once possessed is like these broken tablets, and one should take care to continue to respect such an elder for the Torah that the elder once possessed.

The Sifre taught that Exodus 34:6 shows Attributes of God that people should emulate. Deuteronomy 11:22 enjoins people "to love the Lord your God, to walk in all His ways." The Sifre taught that to walk in God's ways means to be, in the words of Exodus 34:6, "merciful and gracious."

The Jerusalem Talmud saw God's Attribute of forgiveness in Exodus 34:6. The Jerusalem Talmud taught that if, on the Day of Judgment, the greater part of one's record consists of honorable deeds, one will inherit the Garden of Eden, but if the greater part consists of transgressions, one will inherit Gehenna. If the record is evenly balanced, Rabbi Yosé ben Ḥaninah read Numbers 14:18 not to say "forgives sins," but rather "forgives [a] sin." That is to say, God tears up one document recording a sin, so that one's honorable deeds then will outweigh one's sins and one can inherit the Garden of Eden. Reading Psalm 62:13, "To You, O Lord, belongs steadfast love. For You requite a person according to his work," Rabbi Eleazar argued that Psalm 62:13 does not say "his deed," but "like his deed," teaching that if a person is lacking in good deeds, God will give the person one of God's own, so that the person's merits will outweigh the person's sins. The Jerusalem Talmud noted that this is consistent with Rabbi Eleazar's reading of the words "abounding in steadfast love" in Exodus 34:6. Rabbi Eleazar read Exodus 34:6 to teach that God tips the scale in favor of mercy so that a person can inherit the Garden of Eden.

The Babylonian Talmud reconciled apparent inconsistencies in God's Attributes in Exodus 34:6–7. Rav Huna contrasted the description of God in two parts of Psalm 145:17. Rav Huna asked how, in the words of Psalm 145:17, God could be simultaneously "righteous in all His ways," and "gracious in all His works"—how can God be simultaneously just and merciful? At first, God is righteous, and in the end, gracious (when God sees that the world cannot endure strict justice). Similarly, Rabbi Eleazar contrasted two Attributes reported in Psalm 62:13. Rabbi Eleazar asked how it could be simultaneously true that, in the words of Psalm 62:13, "to You, O Lord, belongs mercy," and "for You render to every man according to his work." At first, God "render[s] to every man according to his work," but at the end, "to You, O Lord, belongs mercy." Similarly, Ilfi (or others say Ilfa) contrasted two Attributes. Exodus 34:6 reports that God is "abundant in goodness," and then Exodus 34:6 says, "and in truth." Ilfi asked how both could be true. At first, God exhibits "truth," and at the end, "abundant . . . goodness." Rabbi Joḥanan said that were it not written in Exodus 34:6–7, it would be impossible to say such a thing took place. But Exodus 34:6–7 teaches that God drew a prayer shawl around God's self like the leader of congregational prayers and showed Moses the order of prayer. God told Moses that whenever Israel sins, they should recite the passage in Exodus 34:6–7 containing God's 13 Attributes, and God would forgive them. The Gemara interpreted the words "The Lord, the Lord" in Exodus 34:6 to teach that God is the Eternal (exhibiting mercy) before humans sin and the same after they sin and repent. Rav Judah interpreted the words "a God merciful and gracious" in Exodus 34:6 to teach that with the 13 Attributes, God made a covenant that Jews will not be turned away empty-handed when they recite the Attributes, for soon thereafter, in Exodus 34:10, God says, "Behold I make a covenant."

A baraita reported that Rabbi Elazar said that one cannot read "absolve" in Exodus 34:7 to apply to all transgressions, as "will not absolve" is also stated in Exodus 34:7, as well. Rabbi Elazar resolved the apparent contradiction by teaching that God absolves those who repent and does not absolve those who do not repent. Therefore, both "repentance" and "absolve" were mentioned at Mount Sinai.

Reading the Attribute "long-suffering" ((אֶרֶךְ אַפַּיִם, erekh appayim) in Exodus 34:6, Rabbi Ḥaggai (or some say Rabbi Samuel bar Naḥmani) asked why it says (אֶרֶךְ אַפַּיִם, erekh appayim, using a plural form (meaning "faces" or "countenances") rather than (אֶרֶךְ אַף, erekh af, using the singular form. The Rabbi answered that this means that God is long-suffering in two ways: God is long-suffering toward the righteous, that is, God delays payment of their reward (until the World To Come); and God is also long-suffering toward the wicked, that is, God does not punish them immediately (waiting until the World To Come).

The Pirke De-Rabbi Eliezer told that God spoke to the Torah the words of Genesis 1:26, "Let us make man in our image, after our likeness." The Torah answered that the man whom God sought to create would be limited in days and full of anger, and would come into the power of sin. Unless God would be long-suffering with him, the Torah continued, it would be well for man not to come into the world. God asked the Torah whether it was for nothing that God is called (echoing Exodus 34:6) "slow to anger" and "abounding in love." God then set about making man.

Expanding on Exodus 3:14, "And God said to Moses . . . ," Rabbi Abba bar Memel taught that in response to the request of Moses to know God's Name, God told Moses that God is called according to God's work—sometimes Scripture calls God "Almighty God," "Lord of Hosts," "God," or "Lord." When God judges created beings, Scripture calls God "God," and when God wages war against the wicked, Scripture calls God "Lord of Hosts" (as in 1 Samuel 15:2 and Isaiah 12:14–15). When God suspends judgment for a person's sins, Scripture calls God "El Shadday" ("Almighty God"), and when God is merciful towards the world, Scripture calls God "Adonai" ("Lord"), for "Adonai" refers to the Attribute of Mercy, as Exodus 34:6 says: "The Lord, the Lord (Adonai, Adonai), God, merciful and gracious." Hence in Exodus 3:14, God said "'I Am That I Am' in virtue of My deeds."

In a baraita, the House of Shammai taught that on the great Day of Judgment at the end of days, people will be divided into three groups: wholly righteous people, wholly wicked people, and middling people. The House of Hillel taught that the God Whom Exodus 34:6 describes as "abundant in kindness" will tilt the scales in favor of kindness, so that middling people will not have to pass through Gehenna.

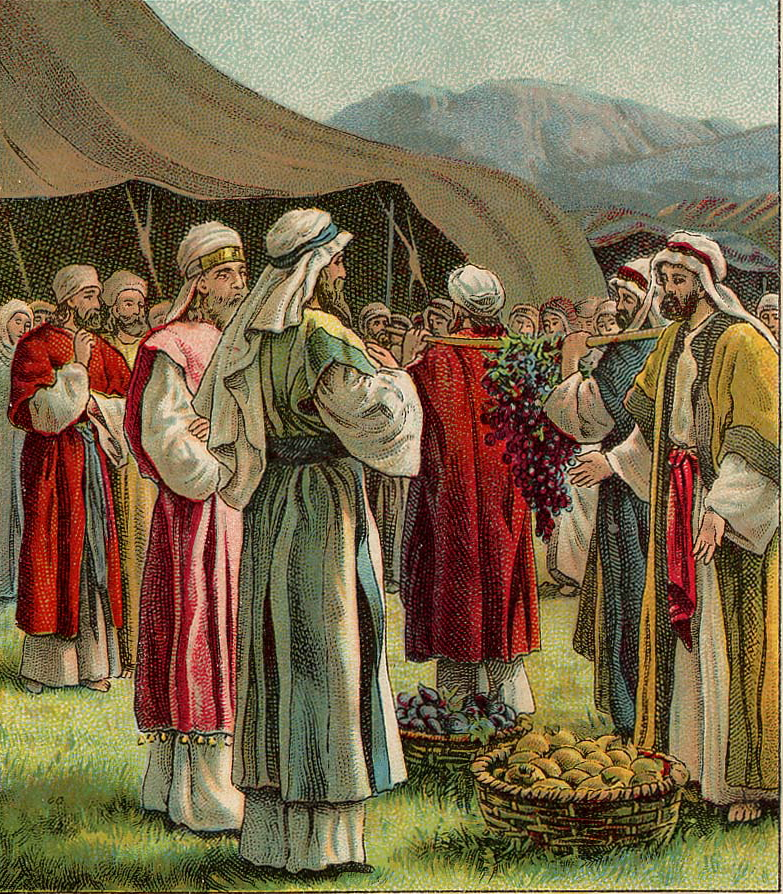
The Two Reports of the Spies (illustration from a Bible card published 1907 by the Providence Lithograph Company)

Rabbi Jose interpreted the words "forgiving iniquity and transgression and sin; and that will by no means clear the guilty" in Exodus 34:7 to teach that a person who sins once, twice, or even three times is forgiven, but one who sins four times is not forgiven. Rabbi Jose cited for support Amos 2:6, where God says, "for three transgressions of Israel," God would not reverse God's forgiveness, and Job 33:29, which says, "God does these things twice, yea thrice, with a man."

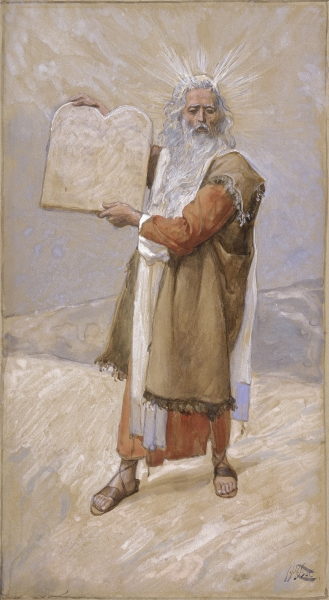
Moses and the Ten Commandments (gouache on board, c. 1896–1902 by James Tissot)

A baraita taught that when Moses ascended to receive the Torah from God, Moses found God writing "longsuffering" among the words with which Exodus 34:8 describes God. Moses asked God whether God meant longsuffering with the righteous, to which God replied that God is longsuffering even with the wicked. Moses exclaimed that God could let the wicked perish, but God cautioned Moses that Moses would come to desire God's longsuffering for the wicked. Later, when the Israelites sinned at the incident of the spies, God reminded Moses that he had suggested that God be longsuffering only with the righteous, to which Moses recounted that God had promised to be longsuffering even with the wicked. And that is why Moses in Numbers 14:17–18 cited to God that God is "slow to anger."

The Seder Olam Rabbah taught that Moses descended from Mount Sinai on the 10th of Tishrei—Yom Kippur—and announced that God had shown the Israelites God's pleasure, as Exodus 34:9 says, "You will forgive our crimes and sins and let us inherit," and after that, all the Israelites presented themselves in the assembly that Moses called in Exodus 35:1, and Moses commanded them to build the Tabernacle.

Tractate Beitzah in the Mishnah, Tosefta, Jerusalem Talmud, and Babylonian Talmud interpreted the laws common to all of the festivals in Exodus 12:3–27, 43–49; 13:6–10; 23:16; 34:18–23; Leviticus 16; 23:4–43; Numbers 9:1–14; 28:16–30:1; and Deuteronomy 16:1–17; 31:10–13.

Tractate Bekhorot in the Mishnah, Tosefta, and Talmud interpreted the laws of the firstborn in Exodus 13:1–2, 12–13; 22:28–29; and 34:19–20; and Numbers 3:13 and 8:17. Elsewhere, the Mishnah interpreted Exodus 34:20 to allow money in exchange for redemption of a first-born son to be given to any priest ((כֹּהֵן, kohen); that if a person weaves the hair of a firstborn donkey into a sack, the sack must be burned; that they did not redeem with the firstborn of a donkey an animal that falls within both wild and domestic categories (a koy); and that one was prohibited to derive benefit in any quantity at all from an unredeemed firstborn donkey. And elsewhere, the Mishnah taught that before the Israelites constructed the Tabernacle, the firstborns performed sacrificial services, but after the Israelites constructed the Tabernacle, the Priests ((כֹּהֲנִים, Kohanim) performed the services.

Reading Exodus 13:13, "And every firstborn of a donkey you shall redeem with a lamb," and Exodus 34:20, "and the firstborn of a donkey you shall redeem with a lamb," the Mishnah noted that the Torah states this law twice, and deduced that one is therefore not obligated under this law unless both the animal that gives birth is a donkey and the animal born is a donkey. The Mishnah thus concluded that a cow that gave birth to a calf like a donkey and a donkey that gave birth to a foal like a horse are exempt from their offspring being considered a firstborn.

The Mishnah taught that the Torah set no amount for the appearance offerings that Exodus 23:14–17 and 34:20 and Deuteronomy 16:16 required the Israelites to bring for the three annual pilgrimage festivals.

Rabbi Akiva interpreted Exodus 34:21 to prohibit plowing prior to the Sabbatical year (Shmita) that would reap benefits in the Sabbatical year and to prohibit reaping in the year after the Sabbatical year produce that grew in the Sabbatical year. Rabbi Ishamel argued, however, that Exodus 34:21 applied to the Sabbath, and limited its prohibition to plowing and reaping not elsewhere required by commandment.

Tractate Sukkah in the Mishnah, Tosefta, Jerusalem Talmud, and Babylonian Talmud interpreted the laws of Sukkot in Exodus 23:16; and 34:22; Leviticus 23:33–43; Numbers 29:12–34; and Deuteronomy 16:13–17; and 31:10–13.

Tractate Pesachim in the Mishnah, Tosefta, Jerusalem Talmud, and Babylonian Talmud interpreted the laws of the Passover in Exodus 12:3–27, 43–49; 13:6–10; 23:15; 34:25; Leviticus 23:4–8; Numbers 9:1–14; 28:16–25; and Deuteronomy 16:1–8.

The Mishnah noted differences between the first Passover in Exodus 12:3–27, 43–49; 13:6–10; 23:15; 34:25; Leviticus 23:4–8; Numbers 9:1–14; 28:16–25; and Deuteronomy 16:1–8. and the second Passover in Numbers 9:9–13. The Mishnah taught that the prohibitions of Exodus 12:19 that "seven days shall there be no leaven found in your houses" and of Exodus 13:7 that "no leaven shall be seen in all your territory" applied to the first Passover; while at the second Passover, one could have both leavened and unleavened bread in one's house. And the Mishnah taught that for the first Passover, one was required to recite the Hallel (Psalms 113–118) when the Passover lamb was eaten; while the second Passover did not require the reciting of Hallel when the Passover lamb was eaten. But both the first and second Passovers required the reciting of Hallel when the Passover lambs were offered, and both Passover lambs were eaten roasted with unleavened bread and bitter herbs. And both the first and second Passovers took precedence over the Sabbath.

Tractate Bikkurim in the Mishnah, Tosefta, and Jerusalem Talmud interpreted the laws of the firstfruits in Exodus 23:19 and 34:26, Numbers 18:13, and Deuteronomy 12:17–18, 18:4, and 26:1–11.

The Mishnah taught that the Torah set no amount for the firstfruits that the Israelites had to bring.

The Mishnah taught that they buried meat that had mixed with milk in violation of Exodus 23:19 and 34:26 and Deuteronomy 14:21.

Rabbi Simeon ben Yoḥai taught that because the generation of the Flood transgressed the Torah that God gave humanity after Moses had stayed on the mountain for 40 days and 40 nights (as reported in Exodus 24:18 and 34:28 and Deuteronomy 9:9–11, 18, 25, and 10:10), God announced in Genesis 7:4 that God would "cause it to rain upon the earth 40 days and 40 nights."

== In medieval Jewish interpretation ==
The parashah is discussed in these medieval Jewish sources:

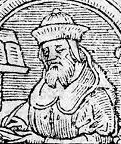
Rashi

=== Exodus chapter 32 ===
Rashi reported an interpretation by Rabbi Moshe ha-Darshan that since the Levites were submitted in atonement for the firstborn who had practiced idolatry when they worshipped the Golden Calf (in Exodus 32), and Psalm 106:28 calls idol worship "sacrifices to the dead," and in Numbers 12:12 Moses called one afflicted with tzaraat "as one dead," and Leviticus 14:8 required those afflicted with tzaraat to shave, therefore God required the Levites to shave as well.

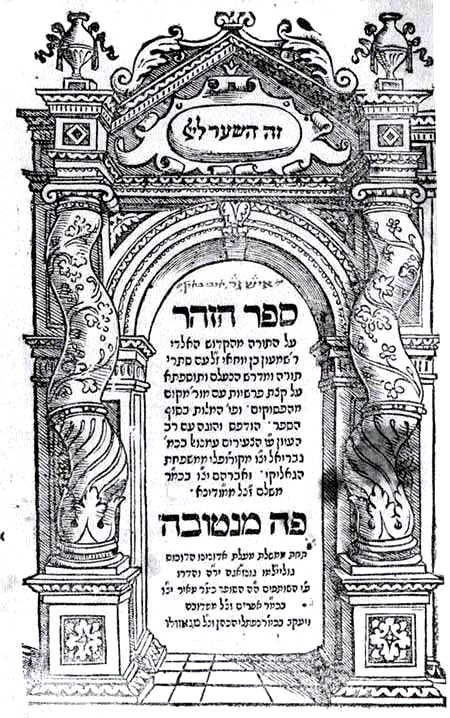
The first page of the Zohar

The Zohar compared Moses to Noah and found Moses superior. For when God told Moses in Exodus 32:10, "Now therefore let me alone, that My anger may grow hot against them, and that I may consume them; and I will make of you a great nation," Moses immediately asked whether he could possibly abandon Israel for his own advantage. Moses protested that the world would say that he had killed Israel and did to them as Noah did to his generation. For when God bade Noah to save himself and his household from the Flood, Noah did not intercede on behalf of his generation, but let them perish. It is for this reason that Scripture names the waters of the Flood after Noah, as Isaiah 54:9 says, "For this is as the waters of Noah to me." Thus, Moses sought mercy for his people, and God indeed showed them mercy.

Reading Numbers 1:1–2 "The Lord spoke . . . in the Sinai Desert . . . on the first of the month . . . 'Take a census,'" Rashi taught that God counted the Israelites often because they were dear to God. When they left Egypt, God counted them in Exodus 12:37; when many fell because of the sin of the Golden Calf, God counted them in Exodus 32:28 to know the number who survived; when God came to cause the Divine Presence to rest among them, God counted them. On the first of Nisan, the Tabernacle was erected, and on the first of Iyar, God counted them.

Baḥya ibn Paquda taught that because God showed special goodness to the Israelites among the peoples, taking them out of Egypt and bringing them to the land of Canaan, God put them under an obligation of service, beyond the universal service expected of all peoples. This consists in obedience to commandments that have their basis in revelation alone, beyond moral duties called for by reason. Baḥya taught that whoever assumed service for the glory of God was favored by God with special bounties, and God held them to an obligation of additional service beside the service due from others. Baḥya cited as an example when Moses said in Exodus 32:26, "'Whoever is on the Lord's side? Let him come to me.' And all the descendants of Levi gathered themselves together to him." God then showed the Levites additional favor and chose from among them Aaron and his sons to be priests. God charged the Levites with particular precepts in addition to those God gave to the rest of the nation, and promised them a great reward in the life hereafter.

=== Exodus chapter 34 ===
Rashi taught that it was on the first day of Elul that God told Moses, in the words of Exodus 34:2, "In the morning you shall ascend Mount Sinai," to receive the second tablets, and Moses spent 40 days there, as reported in Deuteronomy 10:10, "And I remained upon the mountain just as the first days." And on Yom Kippur, God was placated toward Israel and told Moses, in the words of Numbers 14:20, "I have forgiven, as you have spoken."

Rabbeinu Tam identified the Thirteen Attributes of God in Exodus 34:6–7 as follows: (1) (יְהוָה, YHVH: mercy before one sins; (2) (יְהוָה, YHVH: mercy after one has sinned; (3) (אֵל, El: power in mercy; (4) (רַחוּם, Raḥum: compassionate; (5) (וְחַנּוּן, VeḤanun: and gracious; (6) (אֶרֶךְ אַפַּיִם Erekh appayim: slow to anger; (7) (וְרַב-חֶסֶד VeRav ḥesed: and abundant in kindness; (8) (וֶאֱמֶת VeEmet: and truth; (9) (נֹצֵר חֶסֶד לָאֲלָפִים Notzer ḥesed laalafim: preserver of kindness for thousands of generations; (10) (נֹשֵׂא עָוֹן Noseh avon: forgiving iniquity; (11) (וָפֶשַׁע, VaFeshah: and willful sin; (12) (וְחַטָּאָה, VeḤata'ah: and error; (13) (וְנַקֵּה, VeNakeh: and pardoning.

Reading God's description of God's attributes in Exodus 34:6, Baḥya ibn Paquda argued we can see that God possesses these attributes from the evidence of God's deeds towards God's creations and from the wisdom and power that God's deeds reflect. But Baḥya cautioned that one must be careful not to take descriptions of God's attributes literally or in a physical sense. Rather, one must know that they are metaphors, geared to what we are capable of grasping with our powers of understanding, because of our urgent need to know God. But God is infinitely greater and loftier than all of these attributes.

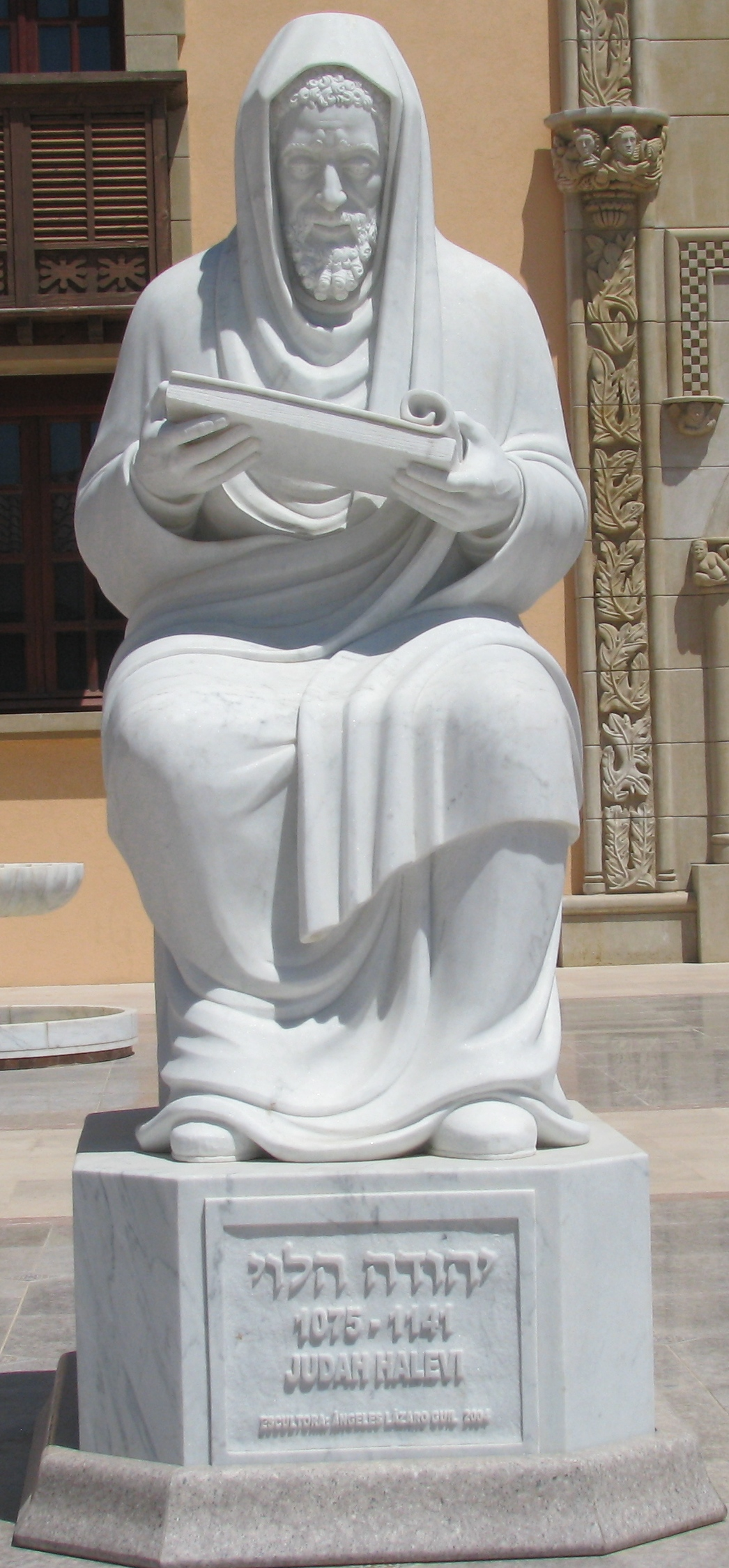
Judah Halevi

Interpreting the Attributes of God in Exodus 34:6–7, Judah Halevi argued that all characterizations of God, except for the four-letter Name of God, the Tetragrammaton, are predicates and attributive descriptions, derived from the way God's actions affect the world. People call God "merciful" if God improves the condition of someone whom people pity. People attribute to God "mercy" and "compassion," although Halevi saw these Attributes as weaknesses of the soul and a quick movement of nature. Halevi argued that this cannot actually be applied to God, who is a just Judge, ordaining poverty for one and wealth to another. God's nature, Halevi argued, remains unaffected, having no sympathy for one, nor anger for another. God decides according to law, making some people happy and others miserable. God appears to people, as we observe God's actions, sometimes (in the words of Exodus 34:6) as a "merciful and compassionate God," and sometimes (in the words of Nahum 1:2) as "a jealous and revengeful God," while in reality God never changes. Halevi divided all Attributes (apart from the Tetragrammaton) into three classes: creative, relative, and negative. And he identified as creative Attributes those derived from God's effect on the world, such as making poor and rich, lifting up or casting down, "merciful and compassionate," "jealous and revengeful," "strong and almighty," and the like.

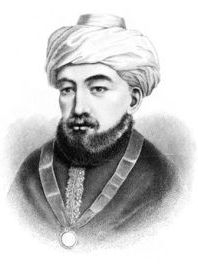
Maimonides

Similarly, Maimonides equated knowledge of God's Attributes with knowledge of God's works. Because in Exodus 34:6–7, God taught Moses Attributes that refer solely to God's works, Maimonides inferred that God had promised to give Moses a knowledge of God's works. Maimonides thus concluded that the ways that Moses wished to know, and which God taught him, were God's actions. Maimonides equated these with what the Sages called "Attributes" ((מִדּוֹת, middot), noting that the Talmud spoke of the 13 "Attributes" of God. And the Mishnah also used the term in reference to man, saying, for example, "There are four different sorts ((מִדּוֹת, middot) among those who go to the house of learning," and, "There are four different traits ((מִדּוֹת, middot) among those who give charity." Maimonides argued that the Sages did not mean that God really possesses Attributes, but that God performs actions similar to human actions that in humans flow from certain Attributes and certain mental dispositions, whereas God has no such dispositions. Although Moses was shown all God's goodness, that is, all God's works, Exodus 34:6–7 mentions only the 13 Attributes, because they include those acts of God that refer to the creation and the government of mankind, and to know these acts was the principal object of the prayer of Moses. Maimonides found evidence for this in the conclusion of the prayer of Moses in Exodus 33:16, "that I may know You, that I may find grace in Your sight, and consider that this nation is Your people." That is, Moses sought understanding of God's ways in governing the Israelites, so that Moses might act similarly. Maimonides concluded that "the ways" used in the Bible are identical with the "Attributes" used in the Mishnah, denoting the acts emanating from God in reference to the universe.

The Zohar, however, found in God's Attributes components of God's essential Name. In the Zohar, Rabbi Simeon taught from the Book of Mystery that the Divine Name has both a revealed and a concealed form. In its revealed form, it is written as the four-letter Name of God, the Tetragrammaton, but in its undisclosed form it is written in other letters, and this undisclosed form represents the most Recondite of all. In the Zohar, Rabbi Judah taught that even the revealed form of the Name is hidden under other letters (as the name ADoNaY, (אֲדֹנָי, is hidden within ADNY, (אדני) to screen the most Recondite of all. In the letters of God's Name are concealed 22 Attributes of Mercy, namely, the 13 Attributes of God in Exodus 34:6–7 and nine Attributes of the Mikroprosopus, the lesser revealed aspect of God. They all combine in one composite Name. When people were more reverent, the priests openly enunciated the Name in the hearing of all, but after irreverence became widespread, the Name became concealed under other letters. At the time when the Name was disclosed, the priest would concentrate his mind on its deep and inner meaning, and he would utter the Name in such a way as to accord with that meaning. But when irreverence became common in the world, he would conceal all within the written letters. The Zohar taught that Moses uttered the 22 letters in two sections, first in Exodus 34:6–7 in the Attributes of God, and second in Numbers 14:18, when he uttered nine Attributes of Mercy that are inherent in the Mikroprosopus, and which are radiated from the light of God. All this the priest combined when he spread forth his hands to bless the people pursuant to Numbers 6:23–26, so that all the worlds received God's blessings. It is for this reason that Numbers 6:23 says simply "saying" ((אָמוֹר, amor), instead of the imperative form "say" ((אִמְרִי, imri), in a reference to the hidden letters within the words of the Priestly Blessing. The word (אָמוֹר, amor has in its letters the numerical value of 248 minus one ((א equals 1; (מ equals 40; (ו equals 6; (ר equals 200; and 1 + 40 + 6 + 200 = 247), equal to the number of a man's bodily parts, excepting the one part on which all the rest depend. All these parts thus receive the Priestly Blessing as expressed in the three verses of Numbers 6:24–26.

== In modern interpretation ==
The parashah is discussed in these modern sources:

=== Exodus chapter 30 ===
Exodus 30:13 reports that "the shekel is twenty gerahs." This table translates units of weight used in the Bible into their modern equivalents:

Weight Measurements in the Bible
Unit	Texts	Ancient Equivalent	Modern Equivalent
gerah ((גֵּרָה)	Exodus 30:13; Leviticus 27:25; Numbers 3:47; 18:16; Ezekiel 45:12	1/20 shekel	0.6 gram; 0.02 ounce
bekah ((בֶּקַע)	Genesis 24:22; Exodus 38:26	10 gerahs; half shekel	6 grams; 0.21 ounce
pim ((פִים)	1 Samuel 13:21	2/3 shekel	8 grams; 0.28 ounce
shekel ((שֶּׁקֶל)	Exodus 21:32; 30:13, 15, 24; 38:24, 25, 26, 29	20 gerahs; 2 bekahs	12 grams; 0.42 ounce
mina (maneh, (מָּנֶה)	1 Kings 10:17; Ezekiel 45:12; Ezra 2:69; Nehemiah 7:70	50 shekels	0.6 kilogram; 1.32 pounds
talent (kikar, (כִּכָּר)	Exodus 25:39; 37:24; 38:24, 25, 27, 29	3,000 shekels; 60 minas	36 kilograms; 79.4 pounds

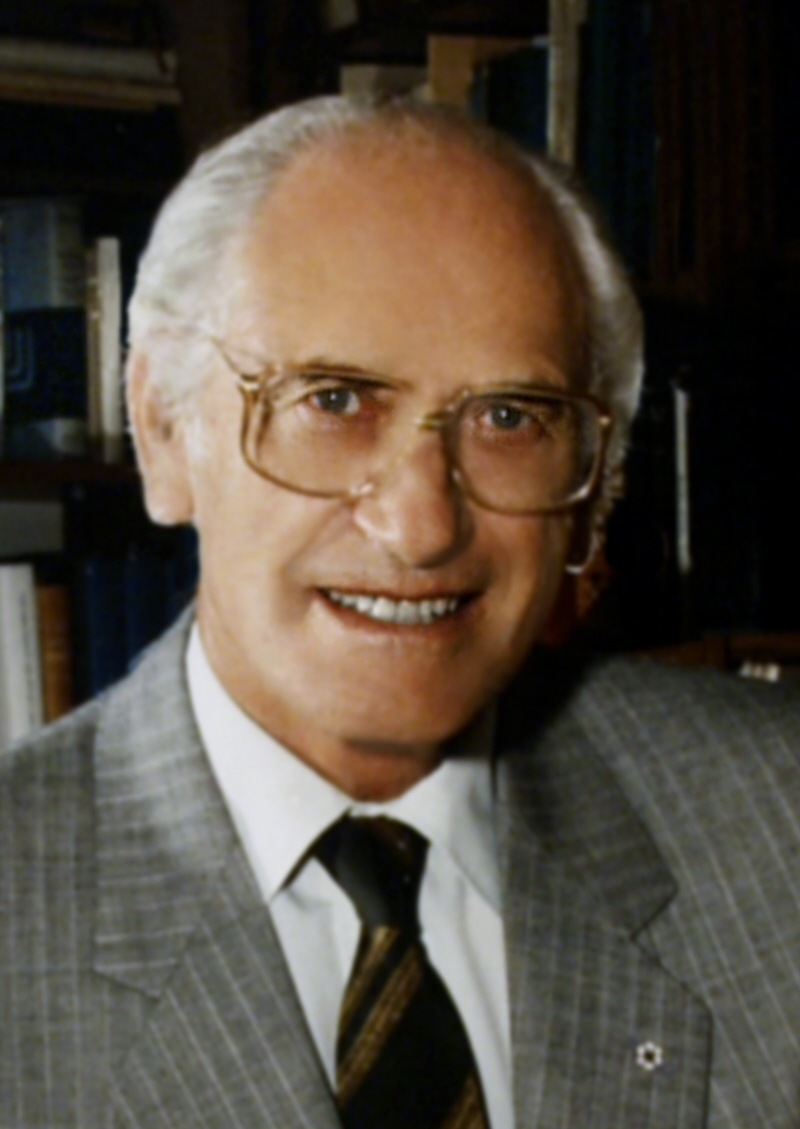
Plaut

=== Exodus chapter 31 ===
Noting that Exodus 31:12–17 commands the Israelites to observe the Sabbath at the end of the instructions for the Tabernacle and then Exodus 35:2–3 commands the Israelites to observe the Sabbath just before the account of the Tabernacle's construction, Gunther Plaut concluded that the Sabbath was the bridge that connected the building of the Tabernacle with its deeper purpose.

Nahum Sarna noted that the injunction to observe the Sabbath in Exodus 31:15 is practically repeated verbatim in Exodus 35:2–3, with an addition not to kindle fire on the Sabbath.

In 1950, the Committee on Jewish Law and Standards of Conservative Judaism ruled: "Refraining from the use of a motor vehicle is an important aid in the maintenance of the Sabbath spirit of repose. Such restraint aids, moreover, in keeping the members of the family together on the Sabbath. However where a family resides beyond reasonable walking distance from the synagogue, the use of a motor vehicle for the purpose of synagogue attendance shall in no wise be construed as a violation of the Sabbath but, on the contrary, such attendance shall be deemed an expression of loyalty to our faith. . . . [I]n the spirit of a living and developing Halachah responsive to the changing needs of our people, we declare it to be permitted to use electric lights on the Sabbath for the purpose of enhancing the enjoyment of the Sabbath, or reducing personal discomfort in the performance of a mitzvah." In 2023, the Committee on Jewish Law and Standards reexamined the issue of driving on Shabbat and concluded that using an electric car for Shabbat purposes is not a violation of Shabbat, although the Committee encouraged walking or riding a bicycle, when possible.

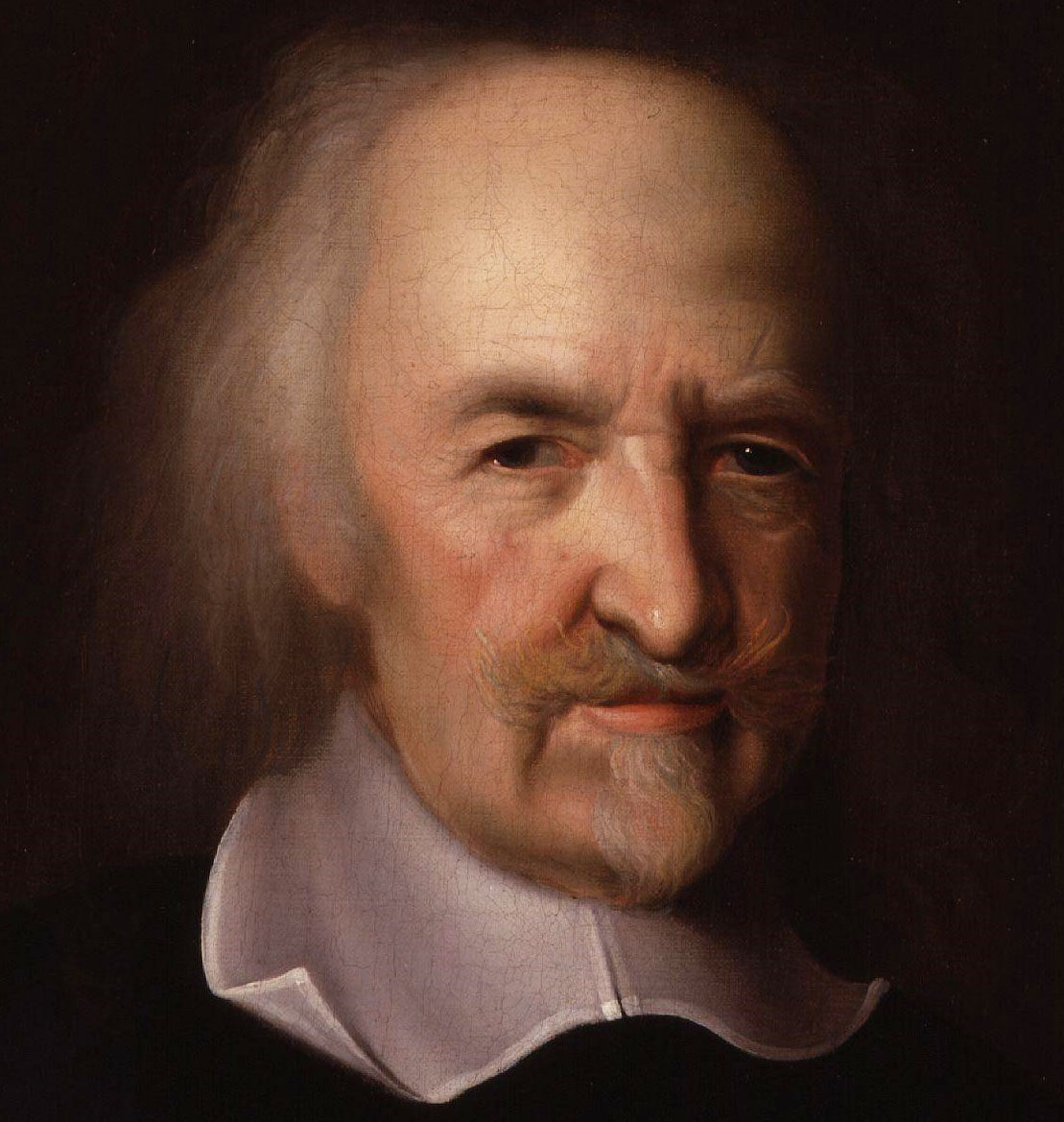
Hobbes

=== Exodus chapter 32 ===
In Leviathan, Thomas Hobbes argued that in supernatural things, people need supernatural signs—miracles—before they consent inwardly and from their hearts. Hobbes cited as an example of the rapid weakening of faith in the absence of miracles how even though Moses had proved his calling to the Israelites by miracles and by leading the Israelites out of Egypt, when Moses was absent for only 40 days, the Israelites revolted from the worship of the true God and set up a golden calf for their god, relapsing into the idolatry of the Egyptians from whom they had been so recently delivered.

=== Exodus chapter 33 ===
Nathan MacDonald reported some dispute over the exact meaning of the description of the Land of Israel as a "land flowing with milk and honey," as in Exodus 3:8 and 17, 13:5, and 33:3, Leviticus 20:24, Numbers 13:27 and 14:8, and Deuteronomy 6:3, 11:9, 26:9 and 15, 27:3, and 31:20. MacDonald wrote that the term for milk ((חָלָב, chalav) could easily be the word for "fat" ((חֵלֶב, chelev), and the word for honey ((דְבָשׁ, devash) could indicate not bees' honey but a sweet syrup made from fruit. The expression evoked a general sense of the bounty of the land and suggested an ecological richness exhibited in several ways, not just with milk and honey. MacDonald noted that the expression was always used to describe a land that the people of Israel had not yet experienced, and thus characterized it as always a future expectation.

Everett Fox noted that "glory" ((כְּבוֹד, kevod) and "stubbornness" ((כָּבֵד לֵב, kaved lev) are leading words throughout the book of Exodus that give it a sense of unity. Similarly, Propp identified the root kvd—connoting heaviness, glory, wealth, and firmness—as a recurring theme in Exodus: Moses suffered from a heavy mouth in Exodus 4:10 and heavy arms in Exodus 17:12; Pharaoh had firmness of heart in Exodus 7:14; 8:11, 28; 9:7, 34; and 10:1; Pharaoh made Israel's labor heavy in Exodus 5:9; God in response sent heavy plagues in Exodus 8:20; 9:3, 18, 24; and 10:14, so that God might be glorified over Pharaoh in Exodus 14:4, 17, and 18; and the book culminates with the descent of God's fiery Glory, described as a "heavy cloud," first upon Sinai and later upon the Tabernacle in Exodus 19:16; 24:16–17; 29:43; 33:18, 22; and 40:34–38.

Diagram of the Documentary Hypothesis

=== Exodus chapter 34 ===
Propp reported a common scholarly view that Exodus 34 contains the Yahwist's (J) Covenant and that the revelation of God's Name in Exodus 34:6–7 corresponds to the comparable scenes from the Elohist (E) in Exodus 3:13–15 and the Priestly source (P) in Exodus 6:2–3. Propp thus argued that Exodus 34:6–7 is one long, full Name for God. Propp speculated that Exodus 34:6–7 might have been God's revelation of a chant that Israelites could use in future crises to remind God of God's transgenerational mercy.

Richard Elliott Friedman observed that the Yahwist's formula in Exodus 34:6–7 emphasizes the merciful—mercy, grace, and kindness—over the just side of God. In contrast, Friedman noted, the Priestly source never uses these or several other related words, emphasizing rather the just side of God. Friedman argued that this then is an important example of the pervasive way in which the Bible became more than the sum of its parts when the Redactor combined the sources, bringing the two sides together in a new balance in the final version of the Torah, conveying a picture of God Who is torn between justice and mercy, which Friedman argued has been a central element of the conception of God in Judaism and Christianity ever since.

The Chofetz Chaim told a parable to explain the teaching of Rav Judah (see "In classical rabbinic interpretation": "Exodus chapter 34" above) that God would not turn Jews away empty-handed when they recite the 13 Attributes of God in Exodus 34:6–7. The Chofetz Chaim told that there was once a wealthy businessman whose poor nephew pleaded with him for a job. The businessman gave the nephew a job, and wrote out a list of tasks describing the nephew's responsibilities. The businessman exhorted the nephew to review the list every day. After a while, the businessman summoned his nephew to ask him what he was doing for the business. The nephew said that he had done everything that the businessman had asked. The businessman pressed the nephew for details. The nephew replied that every day, he recited the list of tasks that the businessman gave him and remembered the list by heart. The businessman asked whether the nephew had done any of the tasks. The nephew answered sheepishly that he thought that since his uncle was the boss, it would be enough for him simply to repeat the list aloud. The businessman called the nephew a fool and explained that the list was only to remind the nephew what to do. Similarly, taught the Chofetz Chaim, the 13 Attributes, while given to Jews to be recited as a prayer, are fundamentally guidelines for how to walk in God's ways.

Phyllis Trible noted that the adjective "merciful" ((רַחוּם, rachum), used in Exodus 34:6 as one of God's Attributes, is tied to the noun "womb" or "uterus" ((רֶחֶם, rechem). Trible wrote that the Hebrew noun for "compassion" or "mercy" ((רַחֲמִים, rahamim) thus connotes both a "mode of being and the locus of that mode," as in the Hebrew the concrete meaning of "womb" expanded to encompass the abstractions of "compassion," "mercy," and "love," the verb "to show mercy" ((רחם, rchm), and the adjective "merciful" ((רַחוּם, rachum).

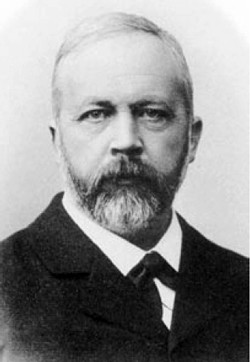
Wellhausen

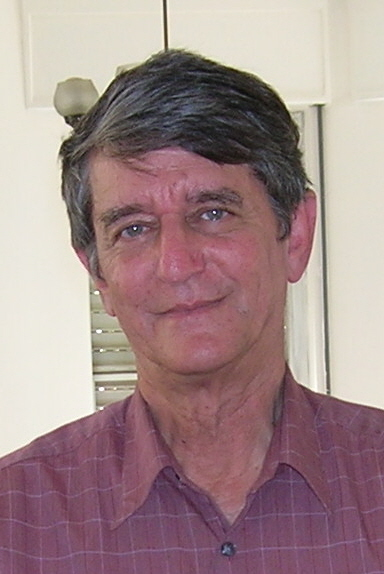
Kugel

Julius Wellhausen conceived of early Israelite religion as linked to nature's annual cycle and believed that Scripture only later connected the festivals to historical events like the Exodus from Egypt. James Kugel reported that modern scholars generally agreed that Passover reflects two originally separate holidays arising out of the annual harvest cycle. One Festival involved the sacrificing and eating of an animal from the flock, the pesa sacrifice, which arose among shepherds who sacrificed in the light of the full moon of the month that marked the vernal equinox and the end of winter (as directed in Exodus 12:6) to bring Divine favor for a safe and prosperous summer for the rest of the flock. The shepherds slaughtered the animal at home, as the rite also stipulated that some of the animal's blood be daubed on the doorposts and lintel of the house (as directed in Exodus 12:7) to ward off evil. The rite prescribed that no bone be broken (as directed in Exodus 12:46) so as not to bring evil on the flock from which the sacrifice came. Scholars suggest that the name pesa derived from the verb that means "hop" (as in 1 Kings 18:21 and 26), and theorize that the holiday may originally have involved some sort of ritual "hopping." A second Festival—the Festival of Unleavened Bread—involved farmers eating unleavened barley bread for seven days when the winter's barley crop had reached maturity and was ready for harvest. Farmers observed this Festival with a trip to a local sanctuary (as in Exodus 23:17 and 34:23). Modern scholars believe that the absence of yeast in the bread indicated purity (as in Leviticus 2:11). The listing of Festivals in Exodus 23:14–17 and 34:18–23 appear to provide evidence for the independent existence of the Festival of Unleavened Bread. Modern scholars suggest that the farmers' Festival of Unleavened Bread and the shepherds' Passover later merged into a single festival, Passover moved from the home to the Temple, and the combined festival was explicitly connected to the Exodus (as in Deuteronomy 16:1–4).

== Commandments ==
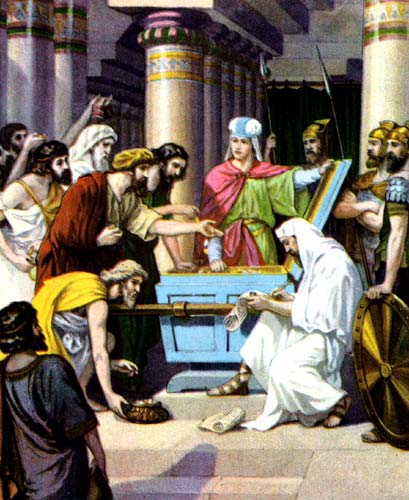
Collecting the Tax for the Temple (illustration from a Bible card published by the Providence Lithograph Company)

According to Sefer ha-Chinuch, there are 4 positive and 5 negative commandments in the parashah:

- To give a half shekel annually
- A Kohen must wash his hands and feet before service.
- To prepare the anointing oil
- Not to anoint a stranger with anointing oil
- Not to reproduce the anointing oil
- Not to reproduce the incense formula
- Not to eat or drink anything from an offering to an idol
- To let the land lie fallow in the Sabbatical year
- Not to cook meat and milk together

Maimonides, however, attributed to this parashah only the following 4 positive and 3 negative commandments:

- To give a half shekel annually
- A Kohen must wash his hands and feet before service.
- To prepare the anointing oil
- Not to reproduce the anointing oil
- Not to anoint a stranger with anointing oil
- Not to reproduce the incense formula
- To let the land lie fallow in the Sabbatical year

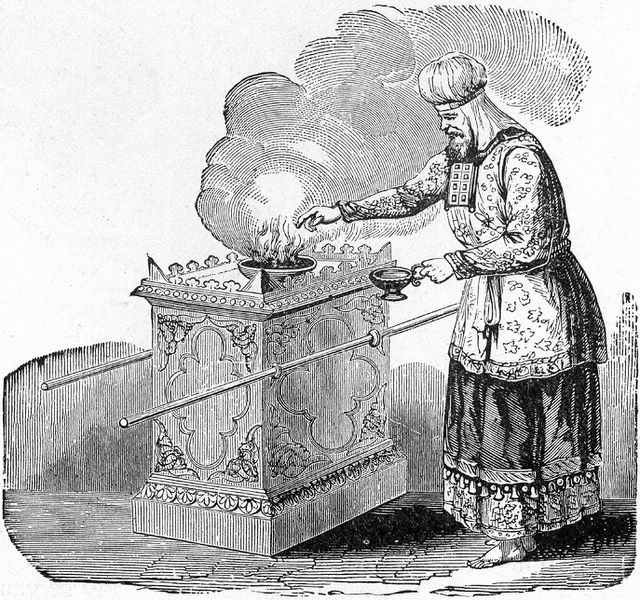
High Priest Offering Incense on the Altar (illustration from the 1894 Treasures of the Bible)

== In the liturgy ==
Some Jews read the descriptions of the laver in Exodus 30:17–21 and Aaron's incense offerings in Exodus 30:7–8 and 30:34–36 after the Sabbath morning blessings.

Some Jews sing of the Sabbath's holiness, reflecting Exodus 31:14, as part of the Baruch El Elyon song (zemer) sung in connection with the Sabbath day meal.

Most Jewish communities (except those who follow the practices of the Vilna Gaon, Chabad, and some Yemenites) recite the account of the Sabbath's significance in Exodus 31:16–17 as the final reading concluding the blessings of the Shema before the punctuating half-Kaddish and the Amidah prayer in the Friday Sabbath evening (Maariv) prayer service. The exhortation to "observe" (V'shamru, (ושמרו) the Sabbath that this reading concludes reflects God's command in Exodus 31:13 to "keep My Sabbaths," even to the exclusion of other apparently worthy causes. Again, Jews recite the account of the Sabbath's significance in Exodus 31:16–17 as part of the V'shamru paragraph of the Amidah prayer in the Sabbath morning (Shacharit) prayer service. And once again, many Jews recite the account of the Sabbath's significance in Exodus 31:16–17 as part of the V'shamru paragraph of the Kiddusha Rabba blessing for the Sabbath day meal.

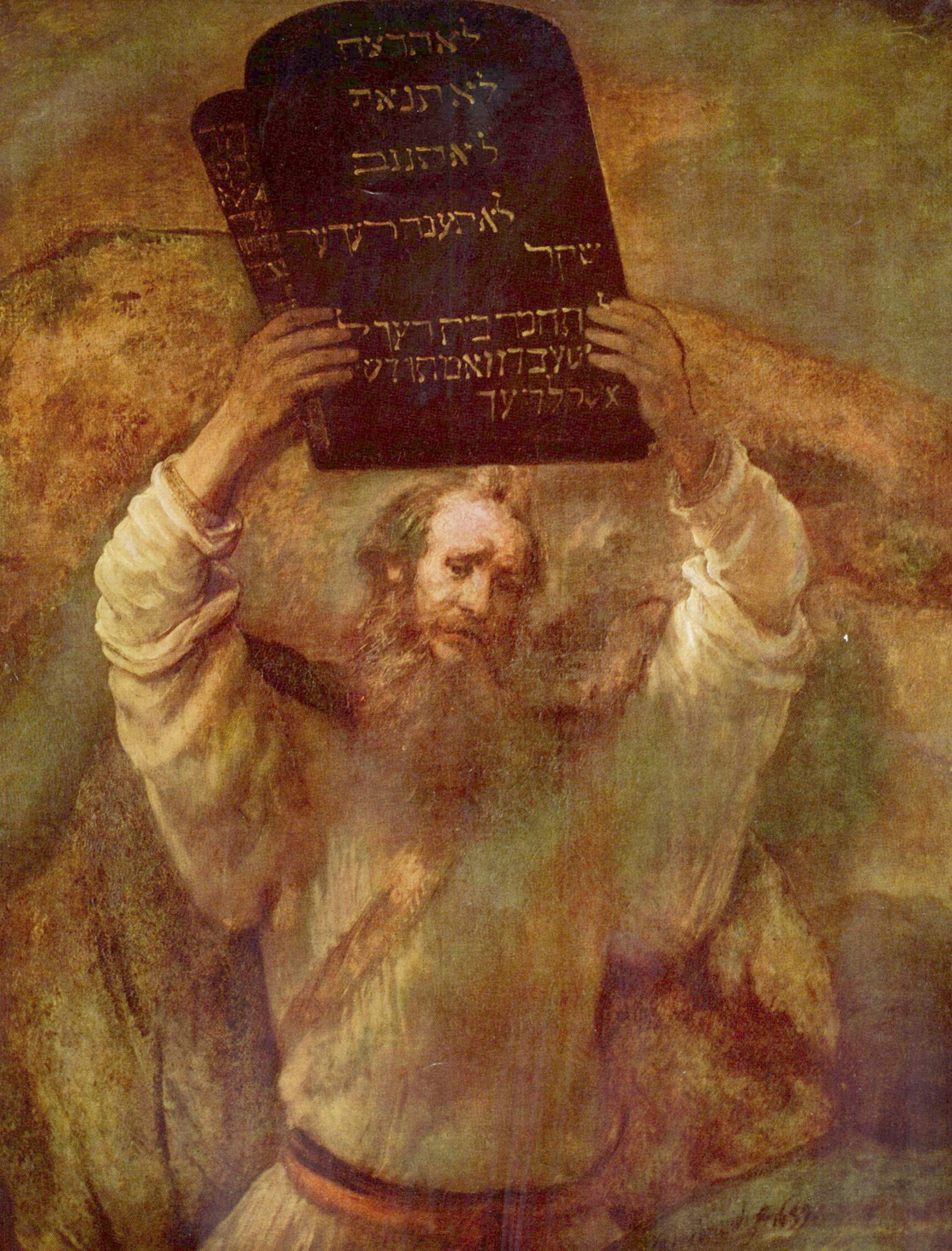
Moses with the Tablets of the Law (1659 painting by Rembrandt)

The second blessing before the Shema addresses God about "your people" Israel, as Moses does in Exodus 32:11–12.

Jews recite the account of how Moses brought down two tablets of stone reported in Exodus 32:15 as part of the Amidah prayer in the Sabbath morning (Shacharit) prayer service.

Some Jews refer to the inscription on the two tablets of stone reported in Exodus 32:15 as they study Pirkei Avot chapter 5 on a Sabbath between Passover and Rosh Hashanah. And thereafter, some quote Exodus 32:16 as they study Pirkei Avot chapter 6 on a succeeding Sabbath between Passover and Rosh Hashanah.

God's characteristics of graciousness and compassion in Exodus 34:6 are reflected in Psalm 145:8 and in turn in the Ashrei prayer in the morning (Shacharit) and afternoon (Mincha) prayer services. Similarly, Jews call on God's characteristic of forgiveness in Exodus 34:6 with the words "forgive us, our Guide" in the weekday Amidah prayer in each of the three prayer services. And again, Jews cite God's characteristic of "steadfast lovingkindness (rav chesed)" in Exodus 34:6 in the Kedushah D'Sidra section of the Minchah service for Shabbat.

Jews recite three times the 13 Attributes of mercy in Exodus 34:6–7 over and over again during Selichot prayers. And the custom of the Ari, accepted in most but not all communities, is to recite them after removing the Torah from the Ark on Passover, Shavuot, Rosh Hashanah, Yom Kippur, Sukkot, and Hoshana Rabbah.

During the Amidah prayer in the Sabbath morning (Shacharit) prayer service, Jews refer to the "crown of splendor" that God placed on Moses in Exodus 34:29.

== The weekly maqam ==
In the Weekly Maqam, Sephardi Jews each week base the songs of the services on the content of that week's parashah. For Parashat Ki Tisa, Sephardi Jews apply Maqam Hijaz, the maqam that expresses mourning and sorrow, as the parashah contains the episode of the Golden Calf, a sad and embarrassing episode in the history of the Israelite people.

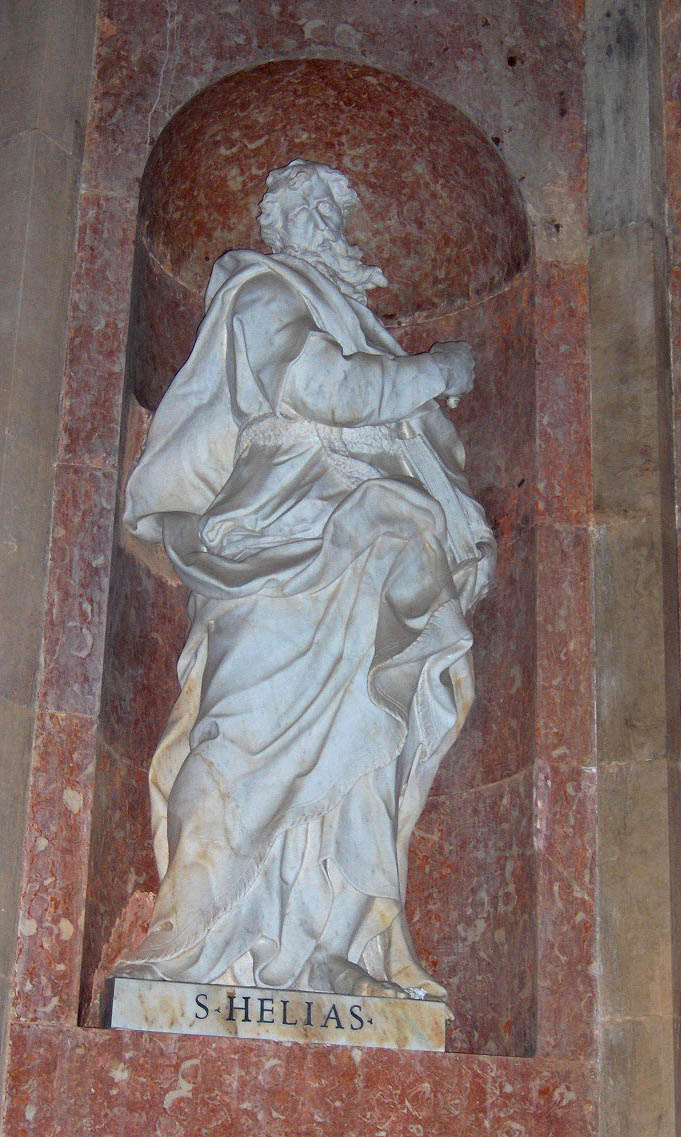
Elijah (statue in the Mafra National Palace, Mafra, Portugal)

== Haftarah ==
=== Generally ===
The haftarah for the parashah is:

- for Ashkenazi Jews: 1 Kings 18:1–39
- for Sephardi Jews (as well as some Ashenazic communities such as Frankfurt am Main): 1 Kings 18:20–39

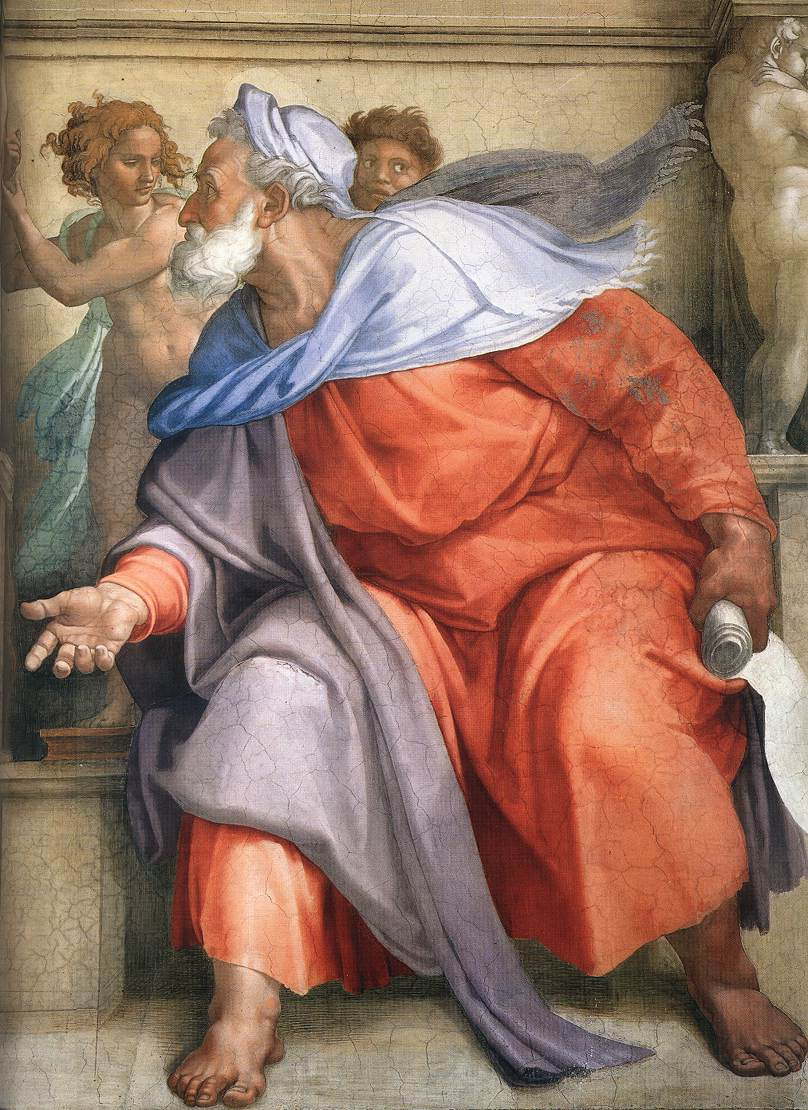
Ezekiel (Sistine Chapel ceiling fresco by Michelangelo, 1510)

==== Connection to the Parashah ====
Both the parashah and the haftarah in First Kings describe God's prophet confronting idolatry to restore worship of God, the parashah in Moses' anger at the Golden Calf, and the haftarah in the prophet Elijah's confrontation with the prophets of Baal. In both the parashah and the haftarah, the prophet was on a mountain; the prophet invoked the names of Abraham and Isaac in prayer to God; sound (kol) is observed; the prophet called on the Israelites to choose between God and the false god; and God manifested God's choice.

=== On Shabbat Parah ===
When the parashah coincides with Shabbat Parah (the special Sabbath prior to Passover—as it does in 2026 and 2028), the haftarah is Ezekiel 36:16–38. On Shabbat Parah, the Sabbath of the red heifer, Jews read Numbers 19:1–22, which describes the rites of purification using the red heifer (parah adumah). Similarly, the haftarah in Ezekiel also describes purification. In both the special reading and the haftarah in Ezekiel, sprinkled water cleansed the Israelites.
