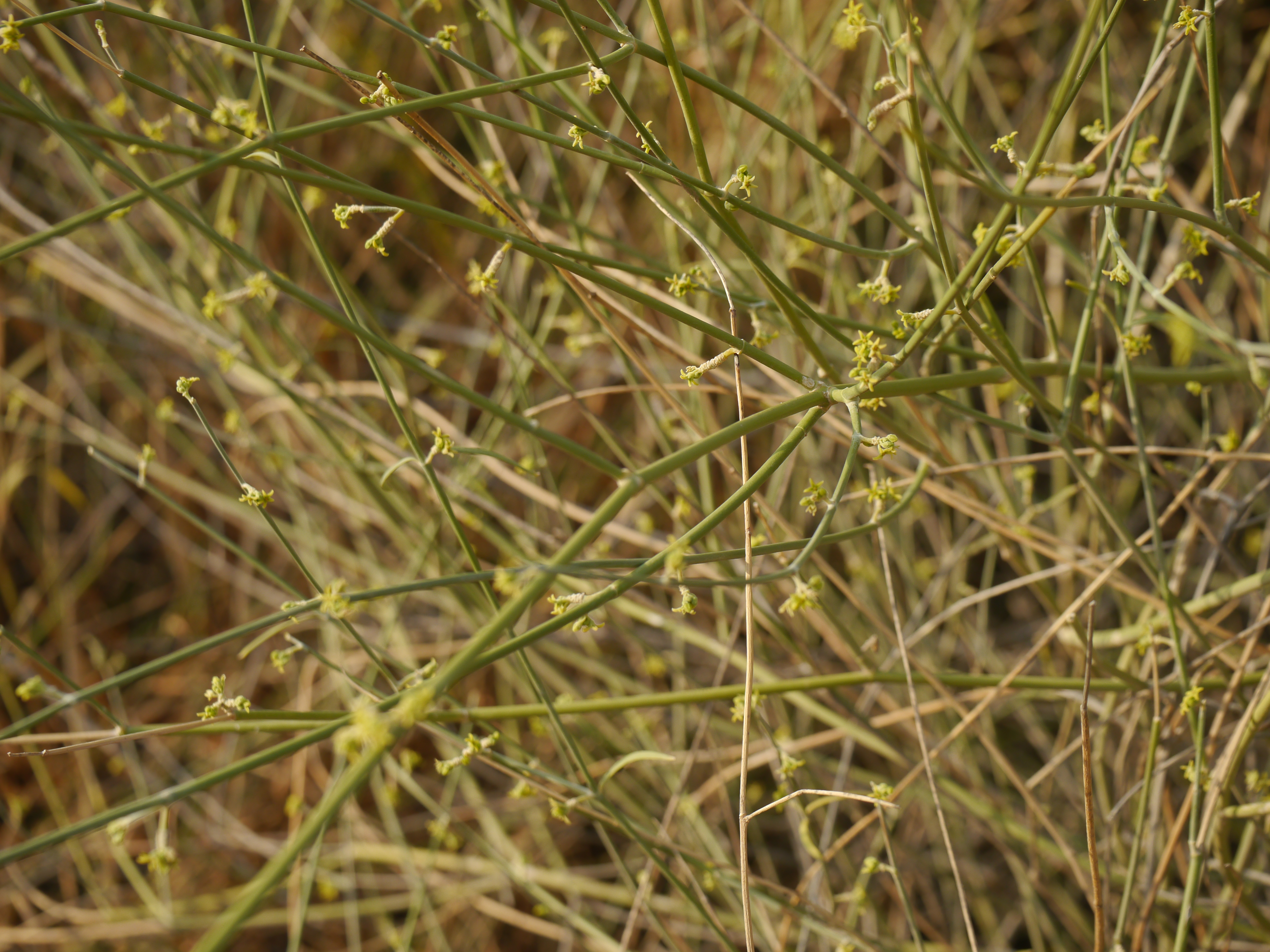

Conservation status
- Least Concern (IUCN 3.1)

Scientific classification
- Kingdom: Plantae
- Clade: Tracheophytes
- Clade: Angiosperms
- Clade: Eudicots
- Clade: Asterids
- Order: Gentianales
- Family: Apocynaceae
- Genus: Leptadenia
- Species: L. pyrotechnica

Binomial name
- Leptadenia pyrotechnica (Forssk.) Decne.

Synonyms
- Cynanchum pyrotechnicum Forssk.; Sarcostemma pyrotechnicum (Forssk.) Schult.; Microloma pyrotechnicum (Forssk.) Spreng.; Periploca pyrotechnica (Forssk.) Spreng. ex Decne.; Leptadenia spartum Wight; Leptadenia gracilis G.Don; Leptadenia jacquemontiana Decne.; Gymnema spartium (Wight) Wall.; Microloma angustifolium Buch.-Ham. ex Hook.f.

= Leptadenia pyrotechnica =

Species of plant

Leptadenia pyrotechnica (Rajasthani: खींप/खीप; Punjabi: ਖਿੱਪ) is the botanical name of a desert herb of the family Apocynaceae. It is widespread from Senegal to India. It is known as khimp/khip in Rajasthani, and khipp in Punjabi.

Being highly drought-resistant, Leptadenia pyrotechnica has played an important role in the desert afforestation programs. The herb khimp is a strong soil binder and, as such, is one of the pioneer species in sand dune fixation.

== Description ==
Leptadenia pyrotechnica is heavily branched and reaches heights of up to 3 metres. The shrub's long roots reach up to 12 metres below the surface. The leaves of the green to grey-green branches tend to fall off early. When present, they are opposite, sessile, elongated to linear, glabrous and about 2 cm long and 3 mm wide.

The very small, greenish-yellow, hermaphrodite and five-fold, short-stalked flowers with a double inflorescence have a diameter of 2 mm and stand in axillary, small cymous inflorescences. The flowers are fine-haired and have a minimal, fleshy corolla. The two ovaries are on top, whilst the stigma and stamens are fused into a very short gynostegium.

The narrow, many-seeded, green, follicular fruits reach 8–11 cm in length. When ripe (like those of the related milkweeds) they dehisce to liberate pappus-tufted seeds, which are carried off by the wind.

== Uses ==
The plant is used in thatching huts. The unripe 'pods' (actually follicles) of this shrub (known in Rajasthani as khimpoli (खींपोळी)) which ripen in the month of March, are of medicinal value and are also used as a vegetable. The fibre from the plant is used for making ropes. The plant itself is browsed by all stock, but most especially by camels for which it is considered a good fodder.

=== Use in traditional medicine ===
A review in 2016 of the literature devoted to the species presented it as possessing antifungal, antibacterial, anticancer, antioxidant, wound healing, anthelmintic, antiatherosclerotic, hypolipidemic, antdiabetic and hepatoprotective properties coupled with other multifarious uses. Almost all parts of the plant are used in the traditional medicinal systems of the various countries in which it grows.

=== Possible ritual use in ancient Judaism ===
Rabbi Adin Steinsaltz tentatively identifies this species as the lost ma'aleh ashan, which formed a key ingredient of the incense (ketoret) offered daily by the priests on the altar in the Holy Temple in Jerusalem. The shrub is known for its flammability - whence the specific name pyrotechnica, bestowed on it because it was used both as a tinder and as an inextinguishable slow match. Its addition to the incense employed in priestly ritual might thus have ensured that the aromatic smoke so generated would rise in a perfectly vertical fashion (i.e. directly up to God) - as described in accounts of the burning of the incense used in the temple.

The recipe for the sacred incense containing the flammable plant ma'aleh ashan (and the identity of the plant itself) were closely-guarded secrets, known only to the Avtinas family who perished without revealing them, refusing to disclose them until their ultimate loss following the destruction of the Second Temple in 70 CE.

According to the Temple Institute, "In our own time, some have speculated that this may be the plant Leptadenia pyrotechnica, which contains nitric acid [sic]."

A recent study undertaken in Saudi Arabia did not, however, reveal unusually high levels of nitrates in the species (of the kind which would account for high flammability) when compared with those of various other desert plants, although this does not necessarily rule out the possibility of higher nitrate levels in Israeli populations of the plant.

Similar firework-like behaviour of fistular plant stems was noted also in ancient China in regard to the hollow stems of bamboo and the bamboo-like shrub Leycesteria formosa - indeed, to this day, the Chinese consider the popping of burning bamboo stems in bonfires to be apotropaic and to have been the inspiration for the invention of pyrotechnics - whereby mixtures containing oxidising salts (such as nitrates) were packed in tubes of similar form.

=== Snack food ===
Shepherds in Niger snack on the raw flowers of the plant, while tending their flocks in the arid areas in which it grows.

== Gallery ==
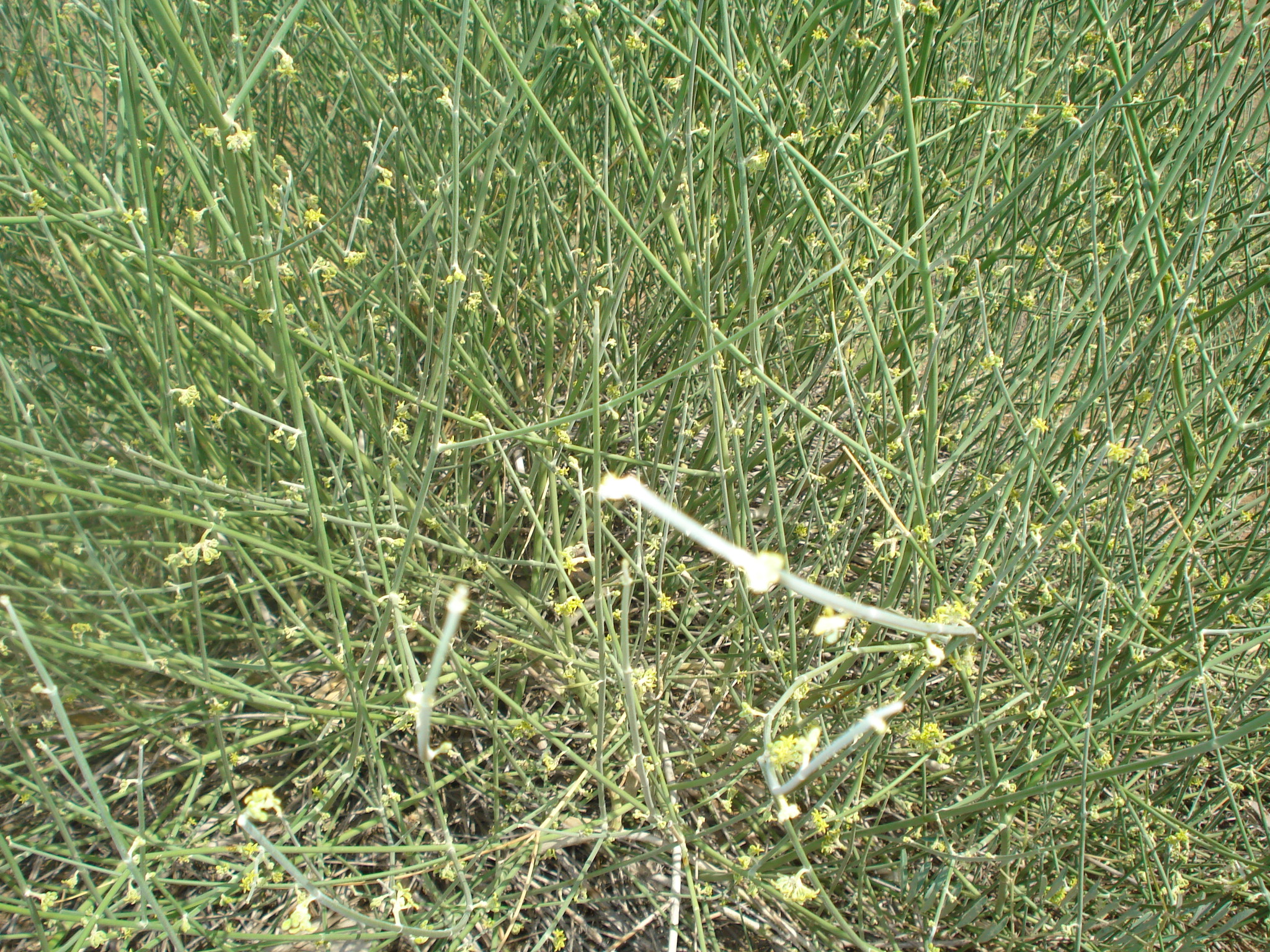
Leafless stems in flower

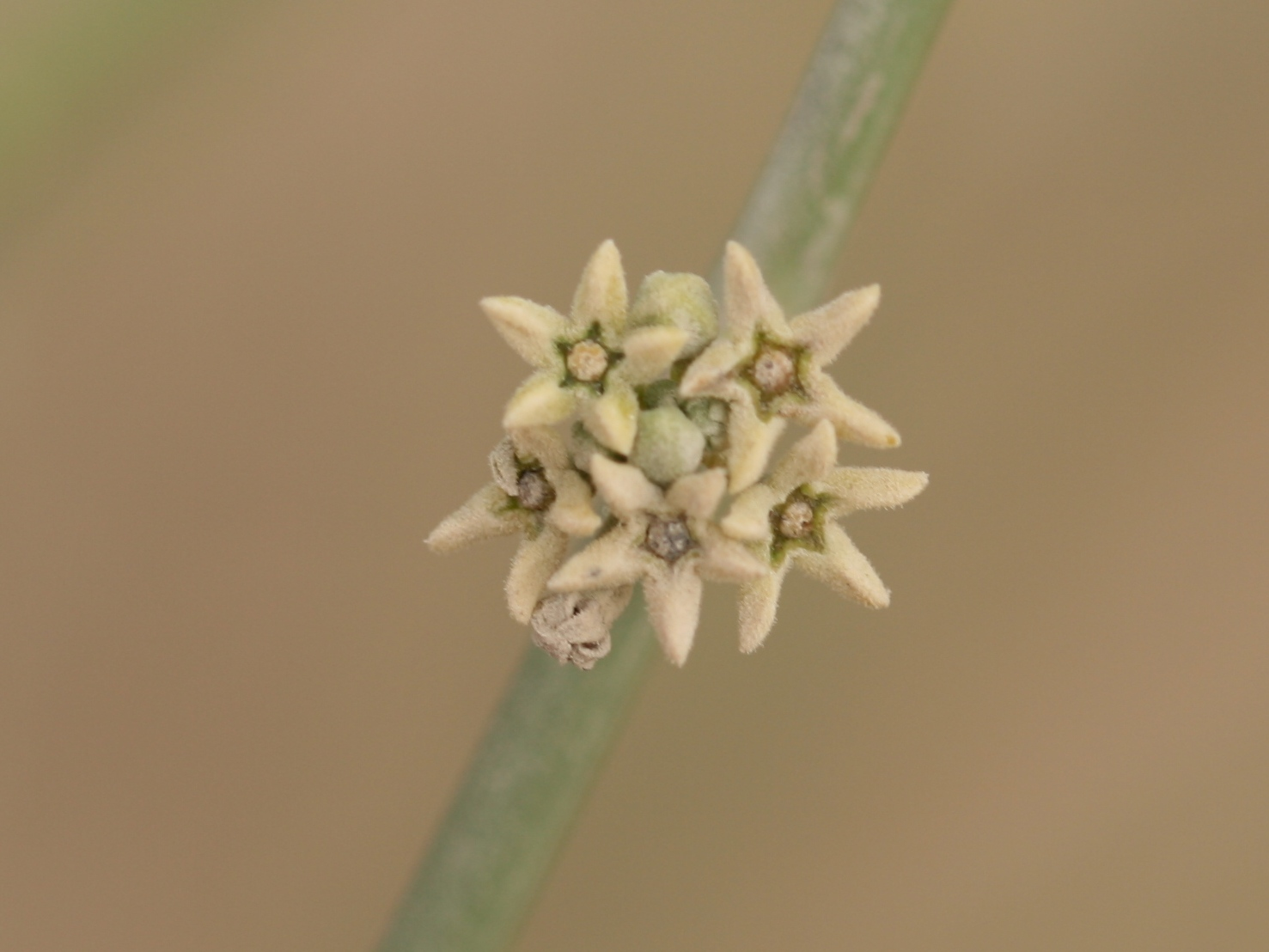
Clustered axillary inflorescence

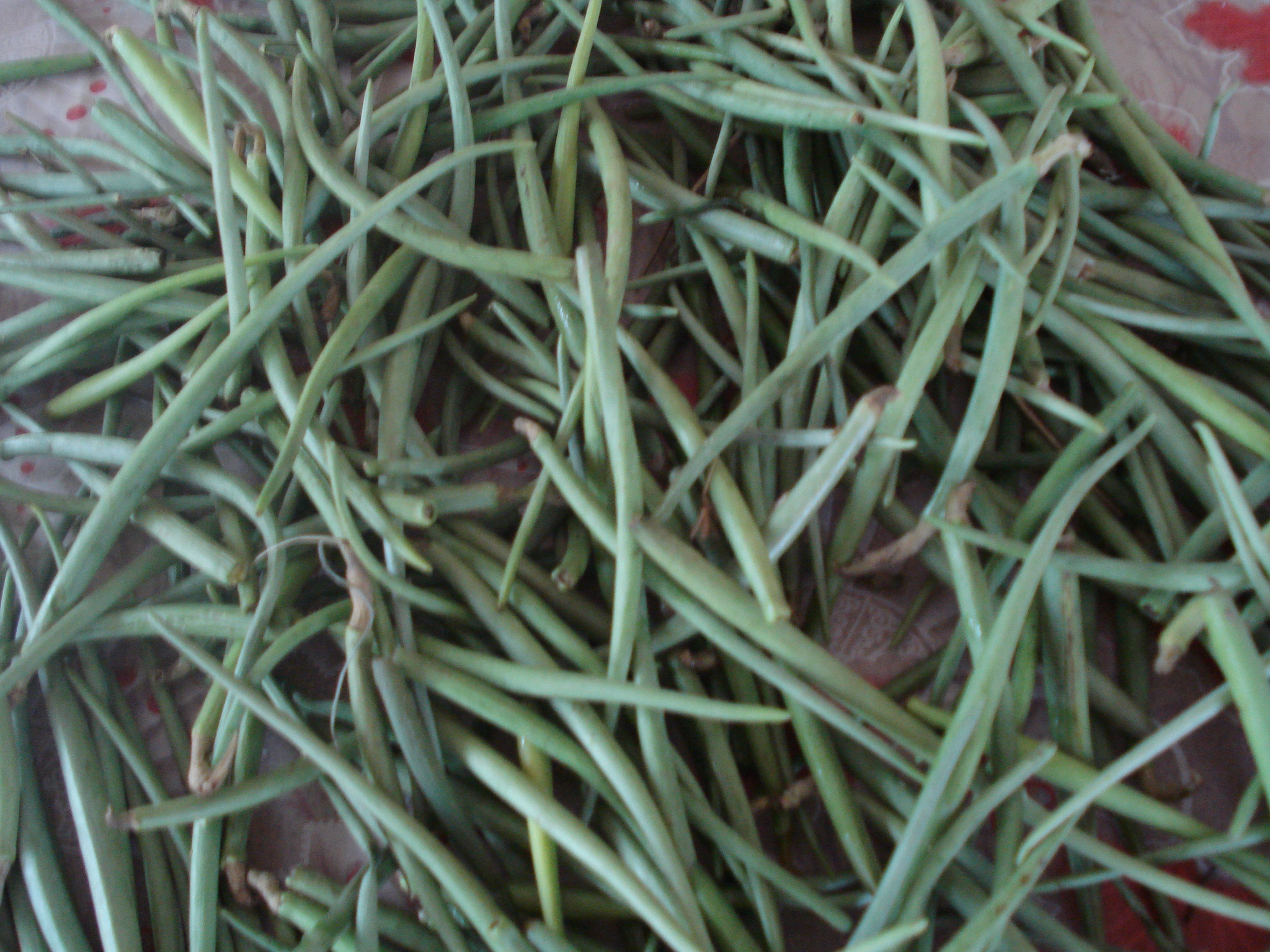
Mass of (harvested) unripe follicles

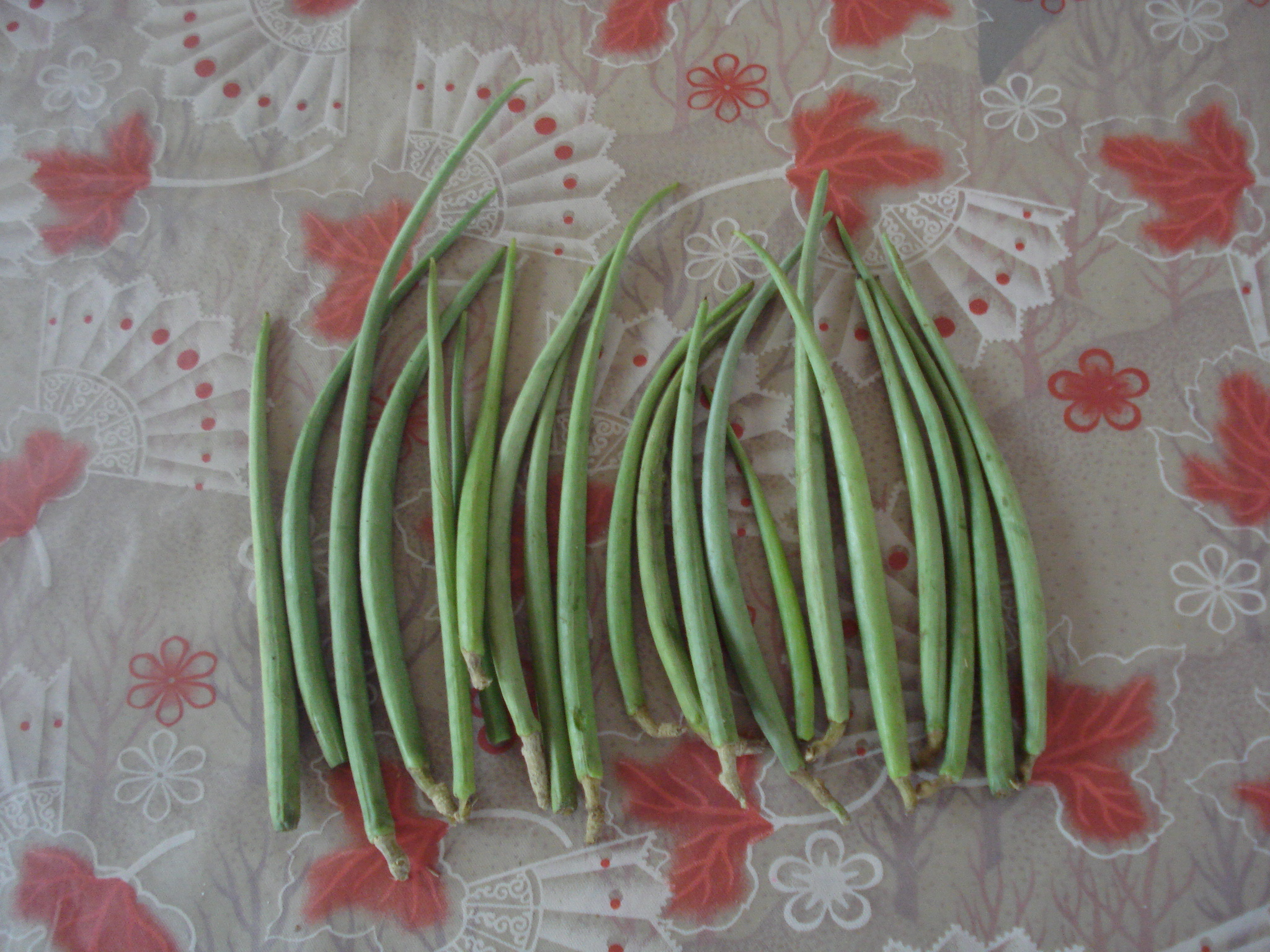
Lined-up, harvested follicles
