= Incense offering in rabbinic literature =

Rabbinic views on the incense formula used in Jewish ritual

The incense offering (Hebrew: קְטֹרֶת, romanized: qəṭoreth), a blend of aromatic substances that exhale perfume during combustion, usually consisting of spices and gums burnt as an act of worship, occupied a prominent position in the sacrificial legislation of the ancient Hebrews.

The correct blend of sweet spices and aromatic condiments used in making the incense offering was a carefully guarded secret at the time of its offering, fully known only by the compounders of the incense offering to prevent its replication in the worship of foreign gods. The priests of the House of Avtinas, who were charged with preparing the incense during the Second Temple period, kept the technique and exact proportions secret, for which the rabbis rebuked them according to the Mishnah, Yoma 3:11. "The craftsmen of the House of Avtinas did not want to teach the secret of the preparation of the incense. [....] about these who were concerned only for themselves it is stated: “But the name of the wicked shall rot” (Proverbs 10:7)."

Today, what is known of the incense offering has been carefully gleaned from Jewish oral traditions. Various conflicting opinions in Jewish classical writings have also filtered down as to its proper composition. Modern scientific research conducted in the last century has shed considerable light on these findings.

== General overview ==
=== Use in antiquity ===
The priests of Aaron's lineage were entrusted with the duty of burning incense in the Temple sanctuary. This was done upon a golden altar laid up within the outer chamber of the inviolable house. Those who were not of the priestly stock were prohibited by law from compounding incense in the same manner in which it was compounded by those of Aaron's lineage. Anyone attempting to do so with the intent of indulging his olfactory senses committed thereby a sacrilege and was made liable on that account to extirpation. However, to compound incense in order to instruct others was permitted, or to burn incense by making use of part of the same components, especially to impart its smell unto clothing, or simply to enhance the ambiance of one's house, this was permitted in Judaism.

During the late Bronze Age, the duty of burning incense was performed by the priests in the Tent of Convocation throughout their journeys in the wilderness while en route to the Land of Canaan. This practice continued all throughout the nascent years of Israel's settlement in the land, when the Tent was pitched in Gilgal, and in Shiloh, and in Nob and in Gibeon, and they did so in the Temple which was built by King Solomon in Jerusalem, and later in the Temple built by the returning exiles. The priests would offer this incense offertory twice a day; once, in the morning, immediately after clearing the stone altar of its coals and which remained after the daily morning whole-burnt offering, at which time, some of the coals were laid up upon the altar of incense. Again, towards the evening, after clearing the altar from its coals and embers, some were put upon the altar of incense within the antechamber of that sacred house. The priests took turns with the incense offering, and this was determined by casting lots between priests who had never yet offered the incense.

Jewish law prescribes that the ingredients used in making the incense be re-pounded twice a year. This was done in a large, movable mortar. In storage, they were to be spread out in the hot summer months to prevent their mold and mildew, but in the winter months they were to be heaped up in a great pile so as not to lose their pungency. It was a custom to chant with the rhythm of the mortar and pestle while pounding the spices, during which they would say: "Pound [it] thoroughly; thoroughly pound [it]." Jewish oral teaching relates that the blend of sweet savors from the compounded incense could be sensed as far away as the mountains of Machaerus (Hebrew: הרי מִכְווָר), in Transjordan.

=== Purpose ===
Some suggest that the command to offer incense was to purify the air and to perfume it, in order to mask the bad odors from the sacrificed animals. Others say that the command to offer incense was to ward off evil spirits and demons, while still others say that the purpose was to atone for the "evil tongue," spoken by one person against another. The Zohar (Ki Tisa) states that the purpose of burning the holy incense was to mitigate and render impending judgments less severe. Philosopher and Rabbi, Maimonides, rationalizes even further and writes: "There is a well-known saying of our Sages, 'In Jericho they could smell the incense [that was burnt in the Temple].' This provision likewise tended to support the dignity of the Temple. If there had not been a good smell, let alone if there had been a rancid smell, it would have produced in the minds of the people the reverse of respect; for our heart generally feels elevated in the presence of some good odor, and is attracted thereby, but it abhors and avoids bad smell."

A more esoteric explanation given for its function is to remind man that all things are from God and for God. The mystical tradition associates ketoreth (קְטֹרֶת) with the Aramaic word קטר, meaning a 'bind' or 'knot.' The incense thus reflects an underlying harmony and inter-connectivity in the universe, as it unites together the core essence of all forces—life, matter, and spirit—according to the recipe prescribed in the Torah.

Another purpose for burning the incense was to cover the Holy of Holies, where the Ark of the Covenant resided, with a kind of 'smoke screen'. The reason for this was to shield the priest from the presence of God. In the Book of Exodus it says that this is where God 'will meet' with the priest. Moreover, the "cloud" was comparable to the smoke which filled the Tabernacle in future generations.

== Formulæ ==
The incense offering is first described in the Book of Exodus:

Take sweet spices, rosin, and onycha, and ḥelbanah, sweet spices with pure frankincense, each spice pounded separately; and you shall make it a blend of incense, even a confection after the art of the apothecary, seasoned with salt, pure and holy.

Although only four spices are specifically mentioned by name, the increased number is arrived at by homiletical interpretation of a verse in the Book of Exodus, and which raises the number of chief spices to eleven. One of the general rules used in biblical exegesis and which was applied to the verse in Exodus 30:34 is this one: "Whenever a generalization is followed by a specification, which again is followed by a generalization, one does not infer from its generalization any lesson other than what is true of its specification." The generalization, in this case, is in the first use of the word "spices," followed by specified details of "rosin" (i.e. any aromatic gum resin that exudes from trees) and the "operculum" (the so-called "fingernail" spice) and "ḥelbanah". These aforesaid specified details are once again followed by a generalization, "spices." This would mean that the "spices" in question can only be those which have similar qualities to those named in the specified details; such as which are true of gum resins (e.g. Mastic, or terebinth gum resin, myrrh, balsam, etc.), and such as which is true of the so-called "fingernail" spice, etc.

For this reason, eleven spices were associated with the incense offering, and their names have come down in a Baraita found in the two Talmuds. These eleven basic ingredients, besides two other adjuncts and three additional ingredients which were used to help enhance the scent of the operculum, are listed as follows:

List of ingredients used in the incense offering
| Hebrew Name | English Name | Taxonomic Name | Notes |
|---|---|---|---|
| הצרי | Mastic resin (rosin) | Pistacia lentiscus | May also include other species of tree exudates: Pistacia palaestina, et al.; bdellium (Commiphora spp.); Styrax officinalis |
| הצפורן | Operculum (gastropod) | Strombus fusus; Strombus murex; Stombus lentiginosus | Identification certain |
| החלבנה | Storax (oleoresin) | Styrax officinalis | Identification disputed. Maimonides calls it a tree, rather than an herbaceous plant, which suggests that he followed Saadia Gaon's identification of this spice. Its identification is believed by others to be the herb galbanum (Ferula galbaniflua) (see infra.) |
| הלבונה | Frankincense | Boswellia carteri | Identification certain |
| מור | Myrrh | Balsamodendron myrrha, syn. Commiphora myrrha, Amyris kataf | Identification certain |
| קציעה | Cassia | Iris pallida (?) | Identification disputed (see infra.) |
| שבולת נרד | Spikenard | Nardostachys jatamansi | Identification certain |
| קנמון | Agarwood | Aquilaria agallocha | Identification disputed |
| כרכום | Saffron | Crocus sativus | Identification certain |
| הקושט | Costus, also called 'Indian orris' | Saussurea lappa or Costus speciosus | Identification certain |
| קלופה | Cinnamon bark | Cinnamomum zeylanicum | Identification disputed |
| כפת הירדן | Jordan amber | Ambergris (Ambra grisea) (?) | Identification disputed (see infra.) |
| מעלה עשן | smoke raiser | unknown | Today, there is only speculation as to what this herb may have been. Some suggest that it may have been the plant Leptadenia pyrotechnia which contains nitric acid. |

The three independent ingredients used in improving the savor of the incense are:

- בורית כרשינה = Karshinah Soap
- יין קפריסין = Cypriot Wine (variant: wine made from the floral envelopes of the caper flower)
- מלח סדומית = Salt of Sodom

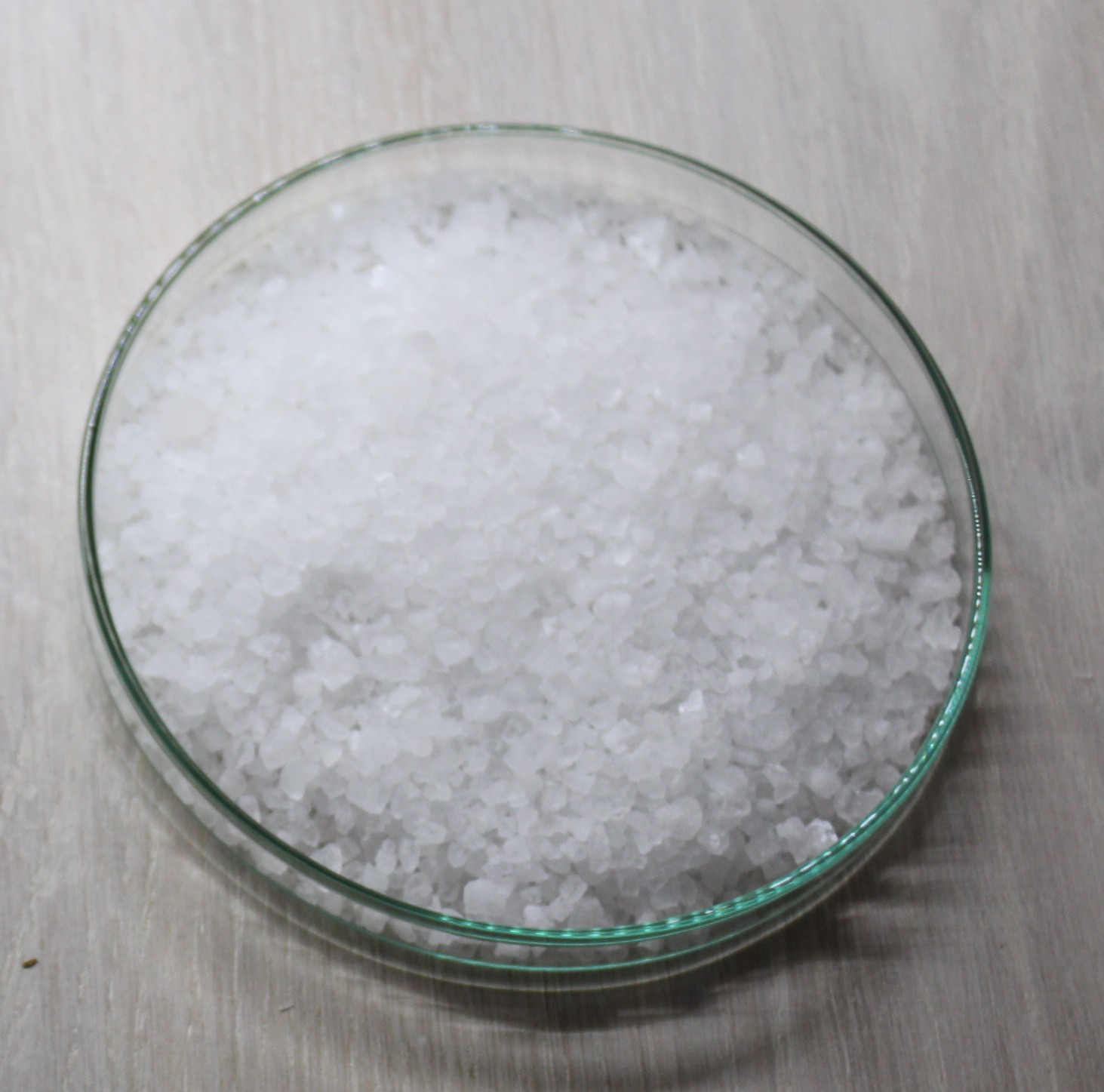
Salt of Sodom

An adjunct to these eleven spices, although not numbered with the eleven, was a spice called in Hebrew Kipath Ha-Yarden, or what some translate as "Jordan amber", and which Maimonides calls in Arabic by the name al-anbar (ambergris). There are varying opinions as to what this spice might have been. Some think, because of its name, that it was a rose that grew along the banks of the Jordan River. Others suggest that it was the sweet resin that exudes from the Storax tree (Styrax officinalis, syn. Liquidambar styraciflua) and which is native to Israel. This was the view of S. Muntner who claims that only later, during the late Middle-Ages, the same name al-ʻanbar was applied also to ambergris which is washed ashore and used in perfumery. His opinion, however, is rejected by the fact that there is a 6th-century Greek reference to the use of ambergris, under the name of "ambra." See: Aëtius of Amida (502–575 CE), Tetrabiblos: Sixteen Books on Medicine, I.131. Ambergris figures largely in ancient records mentioning fragrances used in making perfumes and in burning incense.

The most trustworthy tradition, that of Maimonides', avers that the Jordan amber was ambergris, or what is called in the Arabic tongue al-ʻanbar. Although ambergris is produced in the digestive tract of the sperm whale (Physeter catodon; P. macrocephalus), it was believed by the ancients of Israel to be derived from a "sea-creature" which fed on an underwater aromatic tree, and which later it expectorated and was washed ashore. According to Al-Fasi’s medieval Judeo-Arabic dictionary, this very tree in the midst of the sea was called al-ʻanbar (ambergris), but in Hebrew is called aholoth. This will explain why Rabbi Saadia Gaon (882‒942 CE) wrote in his Siddur (Siddur RSG, p. 93) that the blessing over the fragrance known as ʻanbar is "[Blessed are you, O Lord, etc.] who creates fragrant trees," meaning, al-ʻanbar was considered the product of a tree. Rabbeinu Chananel, echoing these sentiments, thought that al-ʻanbar came from the digestive tract of a fish. Rabbi Saadia Gaon, in his Judeo-Arabic translation on Song of Songs 4:14, and on Psalm 45:9 and Proverbs 7:17, translates the Hebrew word aholoth in all places as ‘anbar (ambergris).

Alternatively, aholoth may have simply referred to "aloes wood," since in the Aramaic Targum of Song of Songs 4:14 and Psalm 45:9, the translators write for אהלות (aholoth) the Judeo-Aramaic word אַקסֵיל אִלוָאָן, which is no more than a Greek loan-word used in the Aramaic tongue; Aksil, meaning "wood," while alwa'an meaning "aloe." The best aloe was known by the ancients as Socotrine aloe (Aloe socotrina), native to the island of Socotra, which happens to be the only aromatic aloe. It is unknown, however, if this condiment was ever used as incense. Rabbi Yonah ibn Ganah (c. 990 – c. 1050 CE), on the other hand, in his Sefer Ha-Shorashim, s.v. אהל, thought that the word "ohalim" in Numbers 24:6 meant sandalwood.

The second and final adjunct added to the above spices was a certain ambiguous plant, the name of which has been withheld by tradition. It was called in Hebrew by its action, "ma'aleh 'ashan" - meaning, "smoke raiser," since its sole function was to cause the smoke of the incense to rise up in a vertical column, before spreading out when it reached the ceiling. Its leaves were mixed in with the other ingredients.

== Penalty for misuse ==
Exodus 30:37-38: "And the incense which thou shalt make, according to the composition thereof ye shall not make for yourselves; it shall be unto thee holy for the LORD. Whosoever shall make like unto that, to smell thereof, he shall be cut off from his people."

Although the Torah mentions only four ingredients, the rabbis and sages received a tradition that there were 11 spices compounded in the holy incense. The Hebrew Bible declares a stern warning against those who replicate the exact formula of the incense. They were not to compound the like of which for themselves, but were permitted to burn aromatic incense in their homes to fumigate clothes, or to have the fragrant smell lodge in the upholstery and woodwork, if it did not follow the exact formula used in the Temple service.

According to biblical teaching, those who are guilty of violating this law would be cut off from God's people, which punishment, according to rabbinic interpretation, is inflicted on that person by God himself. Moreover, the rabbis have made a priest liable to death if he had withheld but one ingredient from the holy incense.

== Synopsis ==
=== Mastic Resin ===
The biblical word used here is נטף = naṭaf (Exo. 30:34), which was later called in Mishnaic times by the name צרי = ṣorī. By the time of the post-Second Temple era its meaning had already become spurious, which led Rabban Shimon ben Gamliel to say: "The ṣorī is no more than gum resin [that drips] from resinous trees." For this reason, Rabbi Saadia Gaon translates naṭaf as mastic. In Arabic-speaking countries, mastic (Arabic: المصطكي) is a generic word used for many chewable gum resins, especially a chewable gum extracted from a species of frankincense. The same is true of its Aramaic/Hebrew cognate (מצטכי). Some Latin texts place here myrrh, whereas other texts place balsam (balsamon), now generally recognized as Balsamodendron opobalsamum, but classified by some botanists as Commiphora opobalsamum, and which has yet still the other taxonomic name of Commiphora gileadensis. Often translated in English texts as "stacte," it implies any gum resin that exudes in drops from certain trees.

One such gum producing tree native to Judaea is the terebinth tree (Pistacia palaestina), mentioned by Dioscorides in his "De Materia Medica," where he writes: "Terminthos is a well-known tree, the leaves, fruit and bark of which are astringent and good for the same things as lentisk (mastic), used and taken in the same way... The resin is brought out of Arabia Petraea. It also grows in Judaea, Syria, Cyprus and Libya, and in the islands called Cyclades. The preferred resin is most clear, white, a glassy color and inclining to an azure [blue], fragrant, and smells like terminthos. The resin from terminthos surpasses all other resins and after it is the lentiscina (Pistacia lentiscus), then Spruce and fir resin." As for the terebinth, the desired resin is often collected in the exocarp that grows on the female trees.

=== Operculum ===
Called sheḥelet in biblical Hebrew, this spice has the more popular English name of "onycha", a word derived from the Greek and effectually translated as "fingernail" because of its resemblance to an animal's claw, or fingernail. Operculum has an aromatic odor when it is put to the coals. Josephus alleges that there were "thirteen spices" used in the incense offering, some of which came "from the sea!" The alleged "sea spice" is confirmed also by Isaac Abarbanel, in his commentary on the Pentateuch (Torah), as well as by Moshe Nahmanides commentary on Exodus 30:34. In his words: "But as for the sheḥelet, it is the 'fingernail' [spice] that comes from the sea."

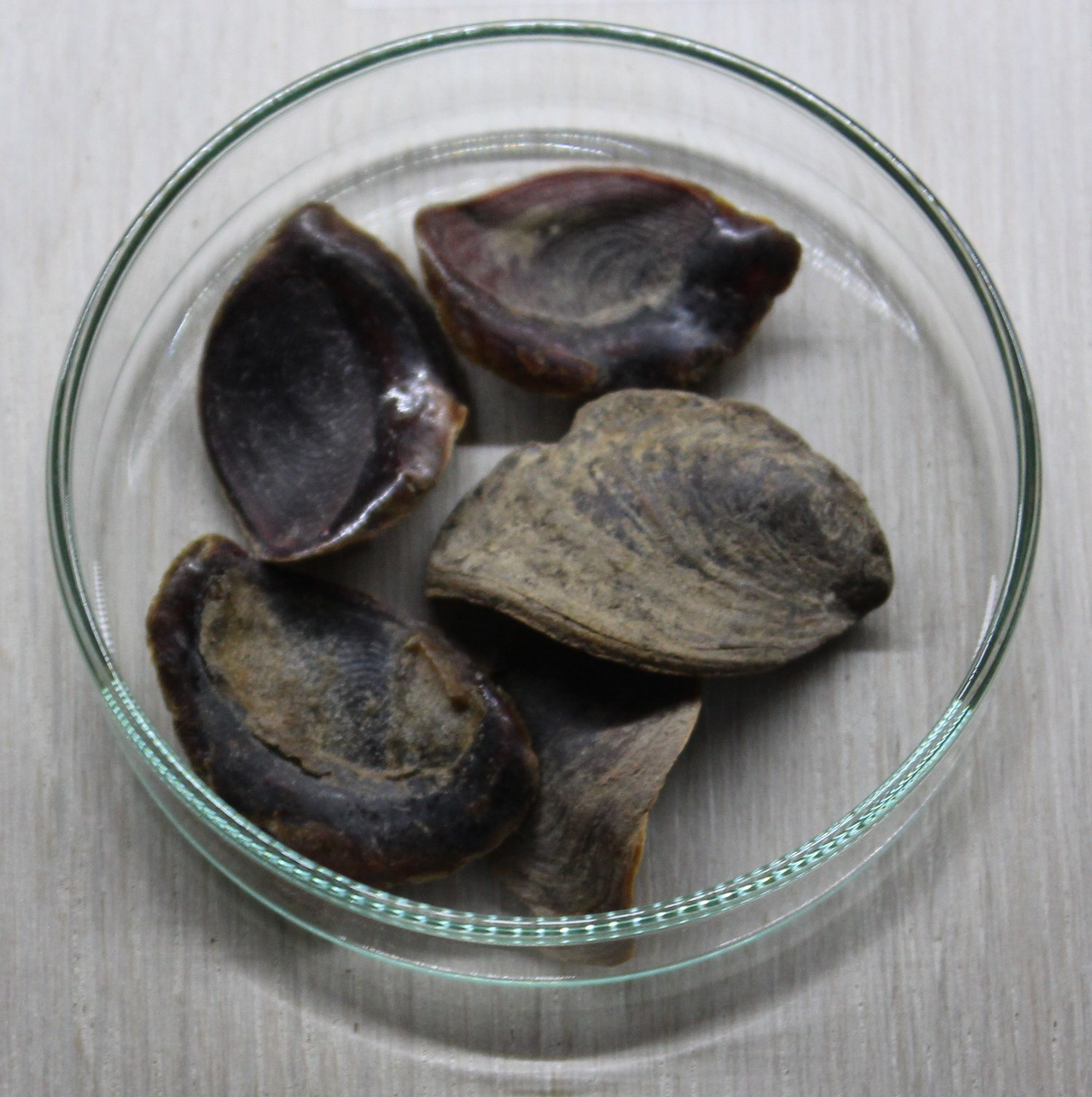
Operculum from sea snails

Indeed, the ancients knew this "fingernail" spice (Gr. onycha) to be the fragrant operculum of certain mollusks (marine gastropods), which had the appearance of a claw. The same object had the function in life of closing the aperture of the mollusk's shell. This fragrant operculum has also been described in Ulysis Aldrovandus' Natural History (De Testaceis), and in Latin was called by the name of Byzantos or Blatta Byzantia. All are said to give forth a good scent when submitted to hot coals resembling somewhat the odor of castoreum. The operculum can be found in those species of mollusks with the following taxonomic names: Strombus fusus, Strombus murex and Strombus lentiginosus.

Although the Talmud says that this spice is "produced on the ground" (Hebrew: גידולי קרקע), Zohar Amar argues that it was an animal product, implying that it was viewed by some as a plant growth only because of the horny plates of these sea creatures were often cast ashore by the waves and were found lying upon the sea shore. Since they did not know its origin, it was formerly thought to be a product of the earth. The Arabians have often mentioned this incense in their books, and is to this very day called by them idhfār al-jinn ("the Devil's fingernails"). It can be found all along the Persian Gulf and the Red Sea. The best quality is said to have come from Jeddah, in Saudi Arabia.

The Ṣippōren (literally "claw" or "fingernail" spice) used in the incense offering, would have also included those species of mollusks known under the taxonomic classification Pleurotoma Babylonia and Pleurotoma trapezii.

=== Ḥelbanah ===
As far as smell, ḥelbanah is said to be the least pleasant of all the incenses. Nevertheless, it was used in the Holy Incense, combining its savors with the others to produce one of the most tantalizing blends of aromatic scents the world has ever known. Maimonides calls it by its Arabic name, maiʻah, being an oleoresin from the storax tree. However, other scholars believe it to have been the reddish brown resin of Ferula galbaniflua, based on the surmised identification of this plant in Greek sources. The problem arising from this identification, however, is that Maimonides writes that it is "a tree endemic to the Grecian cities," whereas Ferula is only an herbaceous plant. The name maiʻah, however, has yet dual meaning. Ibn Rushd, also known as Averroës (1126–1198), says of this resin: "Maiʻah, it is the peel of a tree that resembles the apple [tree] and it has a white fruit... now, it is the dried and liquid galbanum which is pressed from the heart of its heartwood and is called lebni..." Averroës referred to the reddish-brown oleoresin or exudate taken from the Storax tree (Styrax officinalis, syn. Liquidambar styraciflua). When the thin bark of this wood containing the absorbed oleoresin is pared and laid upon hot coals, it emits a vanilla-like scent. By comparison with the other fragrances, its essence was considered "bad."

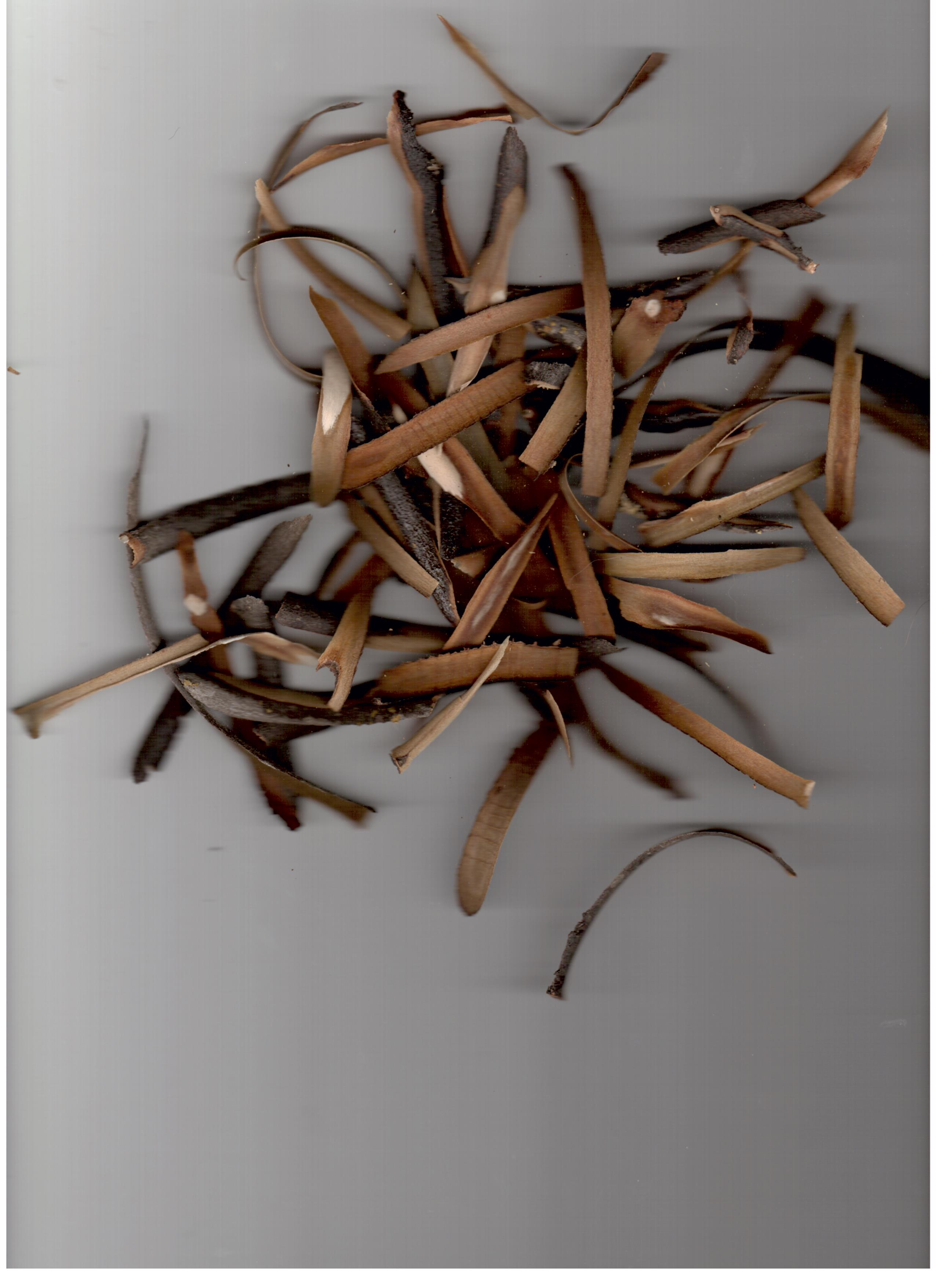
Pared bark of Styrax officinalis containing oleoresin Storax

Like the Arabic name for the storax tree (lubna) which produces the resin, the tree is called in Hebrew livneh (cf. Hosea 4:13). According to Sefer Ha-Arukh, the Hebrew word ḥelbanah (galbanum) > ḥelbanitha has the connotation of devash > duvshitha (syrup). Such a description best fits that of liquidambar. Ibn Ǧanāḥ (c. 990 – c. 1050), probably following Saadia Gaon, also writes in his Sefer Ha-Shorashim, s.v. ח-ל-ב (end): "And then there is ḥelbanah (galbanum) which is called in Arabic lūbnī," meaning, the resin of the storax tree. Sweet storax is also mentioned explicitly alongside other incenses in the apocryphal book, Ecclesiasticus (Sirach) 24:15, whence it is alluded that it was once offered as incense in the tabernacle. Dioscorides (De materia medica 1.79) also acknowledges that the resin of Styrax officinalis was used by people in his day as incense.

Dr. John Hill writes: "The Arabians in general have confounded the solid and liquid storax together; some of their writers however have distinguished them, as Avicenna, who treats of the liquid storax under the name Miha (i.e. maiʻah), and of the dry under those of Astarac and Lebni."

A lesser known opinion states that the "galbanum" (Hebrew: חלבנה) may have been a spice derived from the Mahaleb cherry (Prunus mahaleb), a tree cultivated for an aromatic oil obtained from its seeds. Others have suggested that this spice may have been labdanum, a view rejected by Maimonides.

=== Frankincense ===
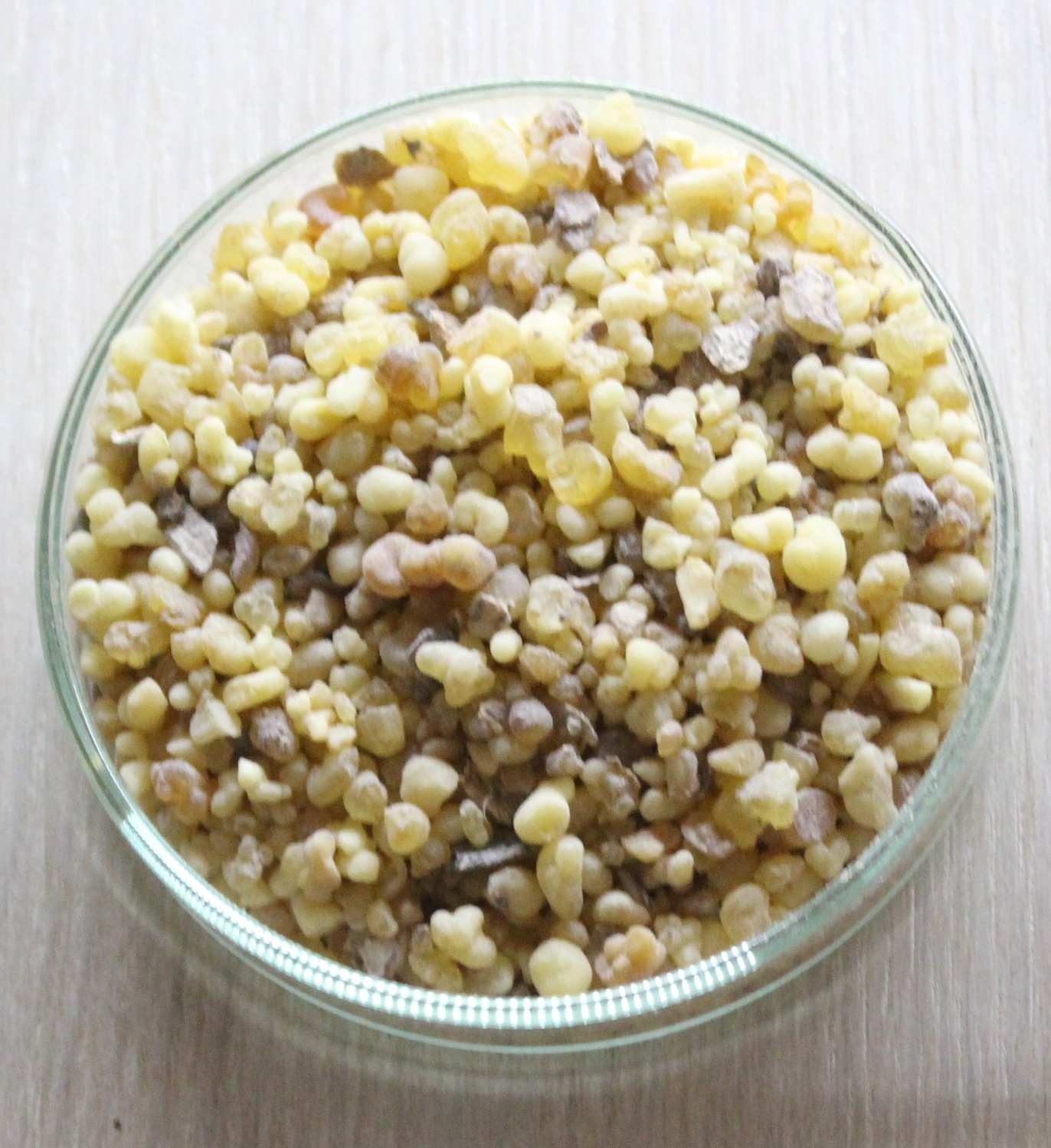
Frankincense

There is little doubt as to the identification of this one incense, and whose name in Hebrew, "levonah," is still related to its Arabic cognate, "lubān." Its name, in Hebrew, is derived from its color, which is a pale-white. According to Jeremiah 6:20, frankincense (Boswellia carteri, syn. Boswellia sacra) was imported into the land of Israel from Sheba, a country generally acclaimed to be Marib in Yemen, or more specifically, the district of Shihr in Yemen. The way in which this precious gum resin was extracted from the tree is described in Pliny's "Natural History." The incense gum olibanum, or frankincense (Boswellia), is also endemic to the Dhofar region of Oman and to Ethiopia, where, in the case of the latter, six species are known to grow. The most common species is that of Boswellia papyrifera (Del.) Hochst., known in Amharic as "itan zaf" (Incense tree), and that of B. rivae (Engl.). In Oman, the traditional method of harvesting the frankincense was to make an incision in the bark and to wait 20 days for the white exudate to exude from the tree when it is gathered.

=== Myrrh ===
The Hebrew word for this incense is מור mor. Maimonides, following a lead by Rabbi Saadia Gaon, believed this incense to have been musk (Moschus moschiferus), the aromatic substance which exudes from a gland on the male musk deer. An incense has been made from it since ancient times. Still, with respect to the Holy Incense, musk is largely thought of today as being an erroneous designation.

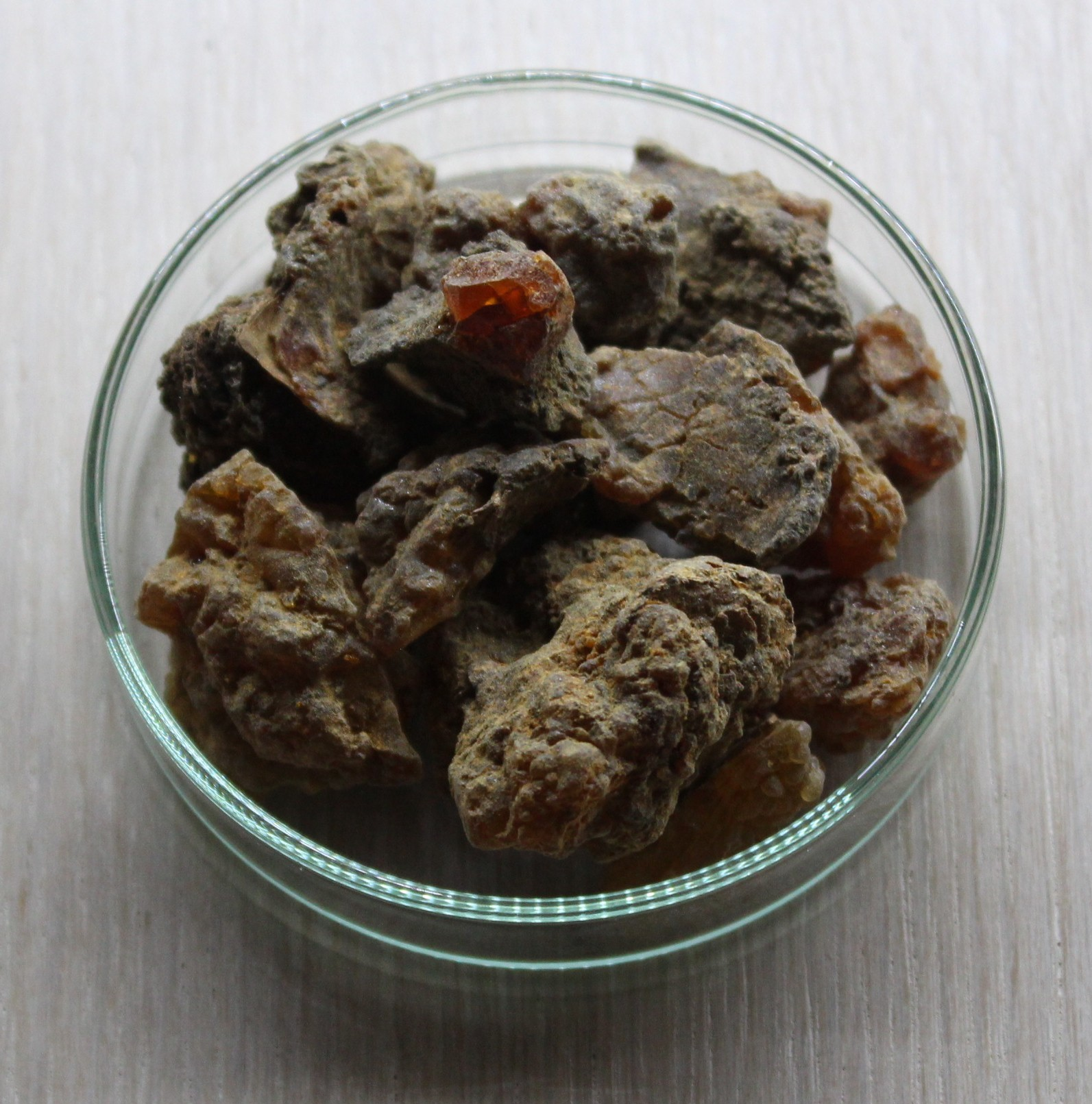
Myrrh

Nahmanides, in his commentary on Exodus 30:23, gives plausible arguments why the mor in the Holy Incense can only be the gum resin myrrh (Commiphora myrrha, syn. Balsamodendrum myrrha) rather than the musk absolute. He notes that in Shir haShirim Rabbah, the mor is said to emit its fragrant odor only when put to heat, whereas the musk absolute already has a sweet odor before it is put to the fire. He also quotes from an early rabbinic source which says that when mor clings to vessels, it serves as an interposing object between the water and the vessel, preventing its valid immersion in a ritual bath. RAMBAN notes that this can only apply to the gum resin myrrh, which is sticky, but NOT to musk absolute taken from the musk deer.

Jonah ibn Janah (c. 990 – c. 1050), in his Sefer HaShorashim, s.v. מור, approaches the subject differently. There, he writes: "Choice myrrh (Exo. 30:23); In oil of myrrh (Esther 2:12), they have explained it in the Arabic tongue [to mean] musk. Yet, they say, ‘I have gathered my myrrh with my spice’ (Song of Songs 5:1), by which there is somewhat which negates that explanation, since the musk is not a plant that is gathered. Now, there is someone who says it is a flower called ‘nesarīn,’ which is possible. They say [elsewhere]: ‘And my hands dripped with myrrh’ (Song of Songs 5:5), he intends to say thereby the oil of myrrh. Nor is there anything to be had from the verse, ‘A bundle of myrrh is my well-beloved’ (Song of Songs 1:13), that would negate the statement of him who says it is not musk, while our Rabbi Haye [Gaon], of blessed memory, in the commentary on [Tractate] Shabbath, says that it is the gum resin called in Arabic ‘lūbenī rahbān’ (= the frankincense of monks), which is a gum resin that has a fragrant smell, and which explanation is altogether fitting with, ‘I have gathered my myrrh’ (Song of Songs 5:1)." Maimonides' view is, therefore, seen as being a fringe view for the reasons given above.

Rabbi Avraham ben David (RAVAD) also objects to Maimonides' view, and insists that an "unclean animal" would not have been used in the Holy Incense, by which it is inferred that he understood Maimonides' words to have been referring to the civet cat (Civettictis civetta) which also produces a musk-like scent used in perfumery. Although human consumption of unclean animals is clearly proscribed in the Torah, where the use of such animals does not entail human consumption, but only smell, there is no prohibition. A blessing is also cited over the fragrant oil of the civet cat.

=== Cassia ===
Cassia (Hebrew: קציעה) is perhaps the most difficult of the eleven spices to identify. Cassia is merely a Hebrew loanword used in English. Onkelos (Aquilas) in Exodus 30:24 translates qidah = קדה as qeṣī'ah = קציעתא, or what is transliterated as "cassia" in English texts. According to Theophrastus' Enquiry Into Plants, the "cassia" is identified with "a bark taken from a fragrant tree," and which modern botanists think may have referred to Cinnamomum iners or Laurus cassia. This opinion, however, seems to be rejected by the translators of the Greek Septuagint (LXX), on Exo. 30:24, as well as by Josephus, who translated the Hebrew word קדה = qidah (cassia), used in compounding the anointing oil, as ΊΡΕΩΣ, meaning the "iris plant," or in some translations rendered as the "oil of cassia."

The Prophet Ezekiel (Ezek. 27:19), in his day, revealed the origins of the flora known as "cassia" and "calamus", saying of the city Tyre: "Dan and GRECIA... occupied in your fairs: they have brought [therein] wrought iron; [also] CASSIA and calamus, were [put by them] in your market." The aforementioned flora are clearly associated with Grecia, rather than with India.

The ancient Greek botanist, Theophrastus, strengthens this notion, saying: "As to all the other fragrant plants used for aromatic odors, they come partly from India whence they are sent over sea, and partly from Arabia... Some of them grow in many places, but the most excellent and most fragrant all come from Asia and sunny regions. From Europe itself comes none of them except the iris."

It is, therefore, highly probable that the קציעה = qeṣī'ah (cassia), equivalent to the biblical קדה = qidah and used in compounding the Holy Incense, was the root of the Sweet iris (Iris pallida; var. Iris illyrica), as noted by Josephus (aka Yosef ben Mattithiah) and the translators of the Septuagint, from whose dried roots is derived the Orris powder and used in cosmetics. Its fragrance resembles that of violets. The Talmud also seems to support this view, saying that there are two types of קדה, one being a tree and the other being an herb. Compare Mishnah Kilayim 1:8, where there is a prohibition of grafting rue (classified as an herb) on white cassia (a tree). Pliny, in his Naturalis Historia, when describing this flora seems to be describing a tree, rather than an herb.

=== Spikenard ===
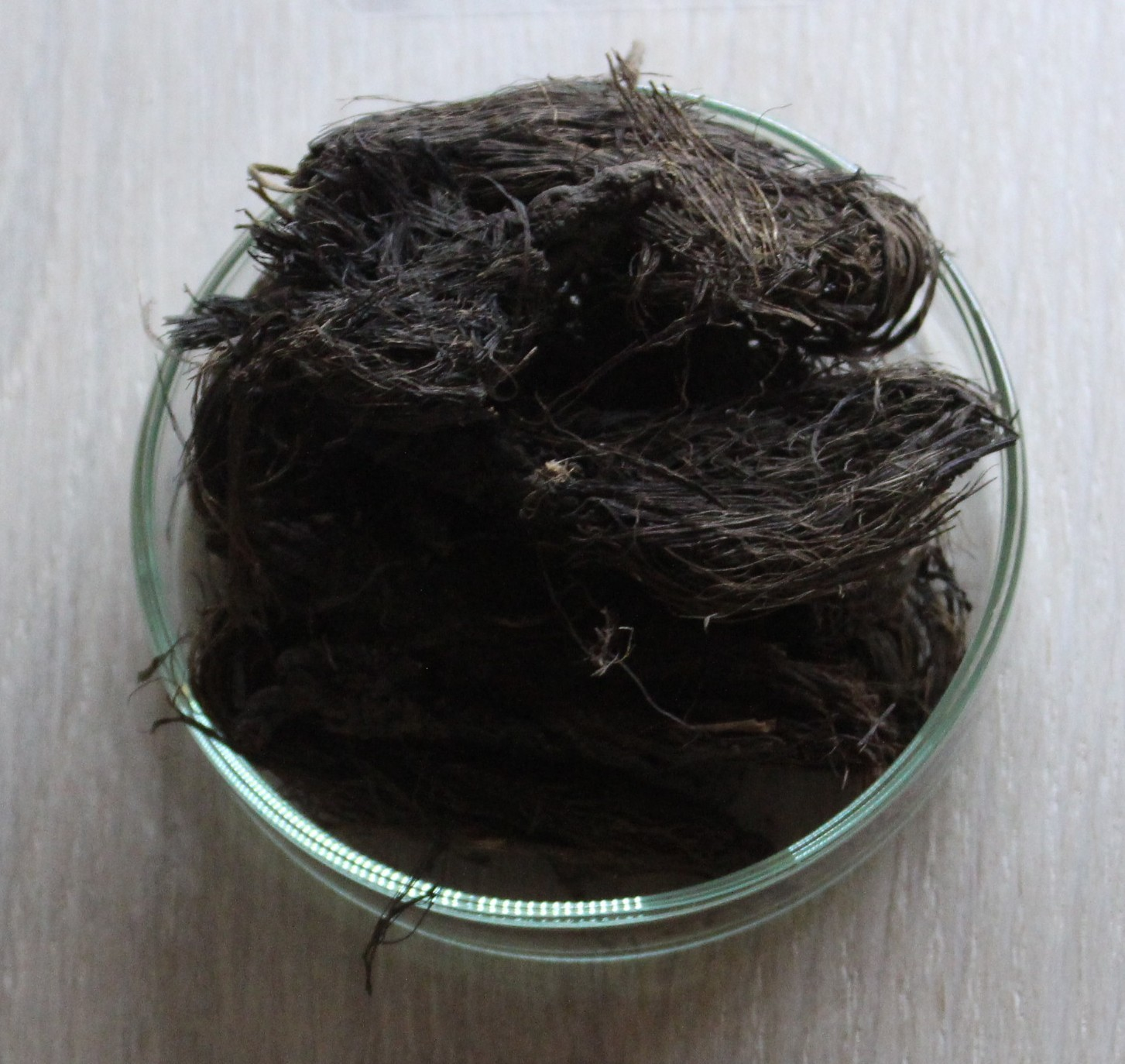
Spikenard

Most scholars agree that this spice was the nard (Nardostachys jatamansi, syn. Nardostachys grandiflora) brought from India, and which same spice is known by its synonym, Valerian (Valeriana jatamansi, syn. V. wallichii), a plant described by Maimonides by its Arabic name, "sunbul." Sir William Jones, in his "Asiatic Researches," concludes that the nard of the ancients was Valeriana jatamansi. This plant is called sunbul, or "spike," by the Arabs, from the fact that its base is surrounded with ears or spikes, whence comes its Hebrew appellation, "shibboleth nerd" = "spike" + "nard." Isidore of Seville, when describing this aromatic, says that it is a prickly herb, light in weight, golden, hairy, small of ear, very fragrant and resembling galingale. Pliny makes note of the fact that the nard which grows in Gaul (Gallia) was merely an herb and differed from the Indian nard. This is believed to have been valerian spikenard (Valeriana celtica) and which the 10th century Arab physician, Al-Tamimi, hails as being the best "spikenard" of Europe. Even so, a far lesser known opinion is that of Rabbi Saadia Gaon who holds this spice to be what is called in Arabic "al-waris" (Arabic: الورس), a name now used for several condiments; one being Flemingia rhodocarpa, and another being the iron-wood tree (Memecylon tinctorium). There was a certain type of "nerd" known to the ancients of Israel which was said to have emitted an unpleasant odour.

=== Aloeswood (Agarwood) ===
==== Problems with identification ====
The Hebrew word used here is "qinnamon" = קנמון. A teaching in the Midrash Rabba says: "Rabbi Huna said in the name of Rabbi Jose, 'This qinnamon used to grow in the land of Israel, and the goats and the gazelles used to reach up to the top of the tree and would eat from it.'" Moreover, among the eleven spices is specifically named, both, "qelufah" (believed to be our regular cinnamon) and "qinnamon," as two individual components. Since the meanings of some words are known to have changed throughout the annals of time, the question many scholars ask themselves is whether or not this happened with the word "qinnamon."

- Rabbi Saadia Gaon (882–942 CE) says that "qinnamon" is "ṣandal," meaning, the heartwood of sandalwood (Santalum album), although he translates "qinnamon besem" in Exodus 30:23 as "al-oud al-ṭayyib," literally meaning "the aromatic wood," and often applied strictly to agarwood (Aquilaria agallocha; var. Aquilaria malaccensis).
- Rabbi Haye Gaon (929–1028 CE) says that "qinnamon" is "darachini," a Persian loanword for our regular cinnamon (Cinnamomum zeylanicum). The Persian loanword is, itself, borrowed from the Hindi, dālacīnī (Cinnamomum cassia).
- Rabbi Avraham ibn Ezra (1092–1167 CE) says that "qinnamon" is "ou[d]ṭayyib," an Arabic word, meaning, agarwood (Aquilaria agallocha).
- Maimonides (1138–1205 CE) says that "qinnamon" is "al-oud," an Arabic word, meaning, agarwood (Aquilaria agallocha; var. Aquilaria malaccensis).
- Nahmanides (1194–1270 CE) conjectures that the "qinnamon" may have been "iḏkhir" (Arabic: إِذخر), meaning, the Aromatic rush (Andropogon schoenanthus; syn. Cymbopogon commutatus), also known as camel's hay.
- J.P. Margoliouth (1856–1933) who is a world-renowned Syriac scholar brings down two definitions for ܩܘܢܡܘܢ / ܩܘܢܡܐ, namely, cinnamon and Styrax, respectively.

==== The cinnamon of classical antiquity ====
According to Pliny the Elder (23–79 CE), the cinnamon plant described by him in his day was a far cry from the cinnamon tree known to us today, and which has led many scholars to think that the ancients referred to a different plant when referring to this one aromatic plant. In Pliny's own words:

The cinnamon shrub is only two cubits in height, at the most, the lowest being no more than a palm in height. It is about four fingers in breadth, and hardly has it risen six fingers from the ground, before it begins to put forth shoots and suckers. It has then all the appearance of being dry and withered, and while it is green it has no odor at all. The leaf is like that of wild marjoram, and it thrives best in dry localities, being not so prolific in rainy weather; it requires, also, to be kept constantly clipped. Though it grows on level ground, it thrives best among tangled brakes and brambles, and hence it is extremely difficult to be gathered... The thinnest parts in the sticks, for about a palm in length, are looked upon as producing the finest cinnamon; the part that comes next, though not quite so long, is the next best, and so on downwards. The worst of all is that which is nearest the roots, from the circumstance that in that part there is the least bark, the portion that is the most esteemed: hence it is that the upper part of the tree is preferred, there being the greatest proportion of bark there. As for the wood, it is held in no esteem at all, on account of the acrid taste which it has, like that of wild marjoram; it is known as xylocinnamum.

Moreover, Pliny seems to have had more knowledge of the tree than did Theophrastus, for Pliny contradicts Theophrastus and rightly claims that neither cassia, nor cinnamon, grow in Arabia as was previously believed by Theophrastus. Pliny informs us that the aromatic "cinnamon" is said to have been native to Æthiopia, and thence sold to the neighboring peoples on the other side of the Erythrean Sea, from whence it made its way to a port city in Gebanitæ, in South Arabia.

Modern scholars are, therefore, disputed as to what this incense might have been, although most would agree that it was not out regular cinnamon (see: infra) even though, in Hebrew, its name is given as "qinnamon." Scholars have at their disposal these early medieval sources on which to rely in their dispute, such as Rabbi Saadia Gaon and Maimonides, amongst others. Researcher Zohar Amar seems to rely upon the 14th century Yemenite Jewish scholar, Rabbi Nathanel b. Yeshaiah, who says: "Qinnamon is the wood that comes from the isles of India, which people use in incense, and whose fragrance is good. It is a wood which the merchants bring from the land of Java (i.e. Indonesia) and is called 'Java wood' (Arabic = oud Jawi)." Java wood is none other than Aloeswood (Aquilaria agallocha; var. Aquilaria malaccensis), or what is also called Agarwood. Likewise, we find that Maimonides writes in his Code of Jewish Law that the "qinnamon" is the wood that comes from the isles of India whose fragrance is good, and which men use in incense." He later gives the specific Arabic name for this one spice, calling it العود = "al-oud", meaning, agarwood (Aquilaria agallocha; var. Aquilaria malaccensis). So, too, in the 15th century Hebrew-Arabic lexicon, "Al-Jāma'," believed to have been compiled by Rabbi David b. Yesha' al-Hamdi, he calls the "qinnamon" by the Arabic name "al-oud," meaning, Agarwood (Aquilaria agallocha), while the "qelufah" he calls "qishr slaykha" = our regular cinnamon. Although there are many names given for agarwood in Sanskrit, one of the names given for this aromatic wood resin is लघुनामन् = laghunAman, a word which still carries the phonetic sound of "qinnamon."

==== Saffron ====
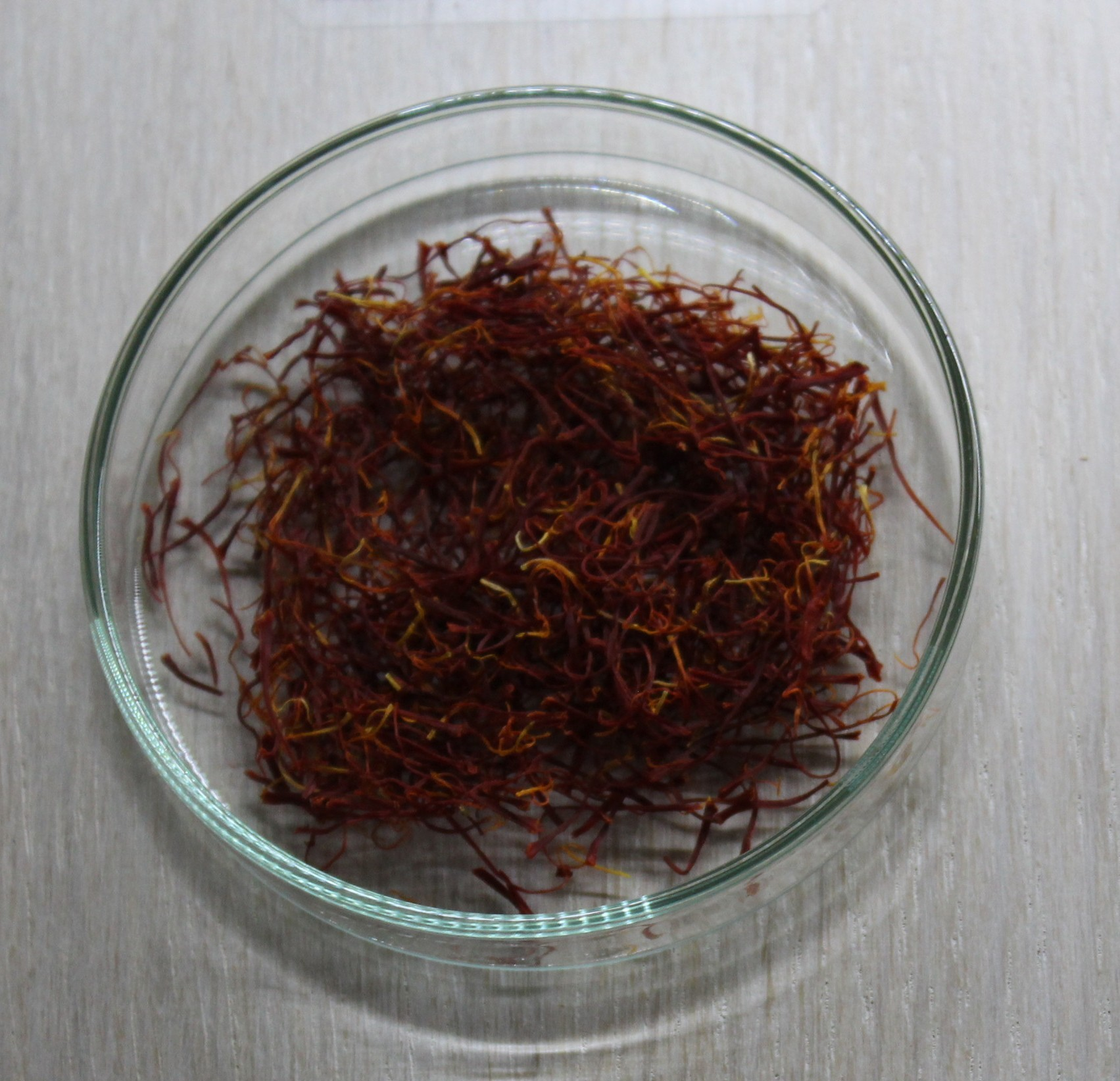
Saffron

Eight species of saffron are known to grow in Israel, some of which are protected by law. The dried stigmas (consisting of the compounds picrocrocin, crocin and safranal), used commercially to produce one of the most expensive food spices in the world, was formerly used as one of the ingredients in the Holy Incense because of its aroma. If mixed with the styles, the spice is called "female saffron," and is of less value. The Tibetans perfected the use of Saffron incense, which they call "nagkeshar."

In most countries, only a short window of opportunity is available for picking the flowers, some as little as 15 days, and which must then be picked in the early hours of the morning before the petals open for its savors to be more efficacious.

==== Costus ====
Scholars are divided as to its true identification. The Indian Orris (Saussurea lappa), or Costus, is a fragrant root of an herb of the Aster family of plants native to Kashmir, and growing in the Himalayan mountains. A highly valued incense is derived from it and is often called by the locals of northern India and China by the name, "pachak." In Sanskrit, however, it is called "kustha," while in Tamalit it is called "kostam. Another plant which bears the name of "Costus" is the Costus speciosus of the Zangiber family of plants, also native to India, and also called "kostam" in Tamalit, but called "kust" in Hindikit." Rabbi Saadia Gaon mentions this plant when describing the "qaneh" (an aromatic cane) of the Bible, saying that it was "Costus."

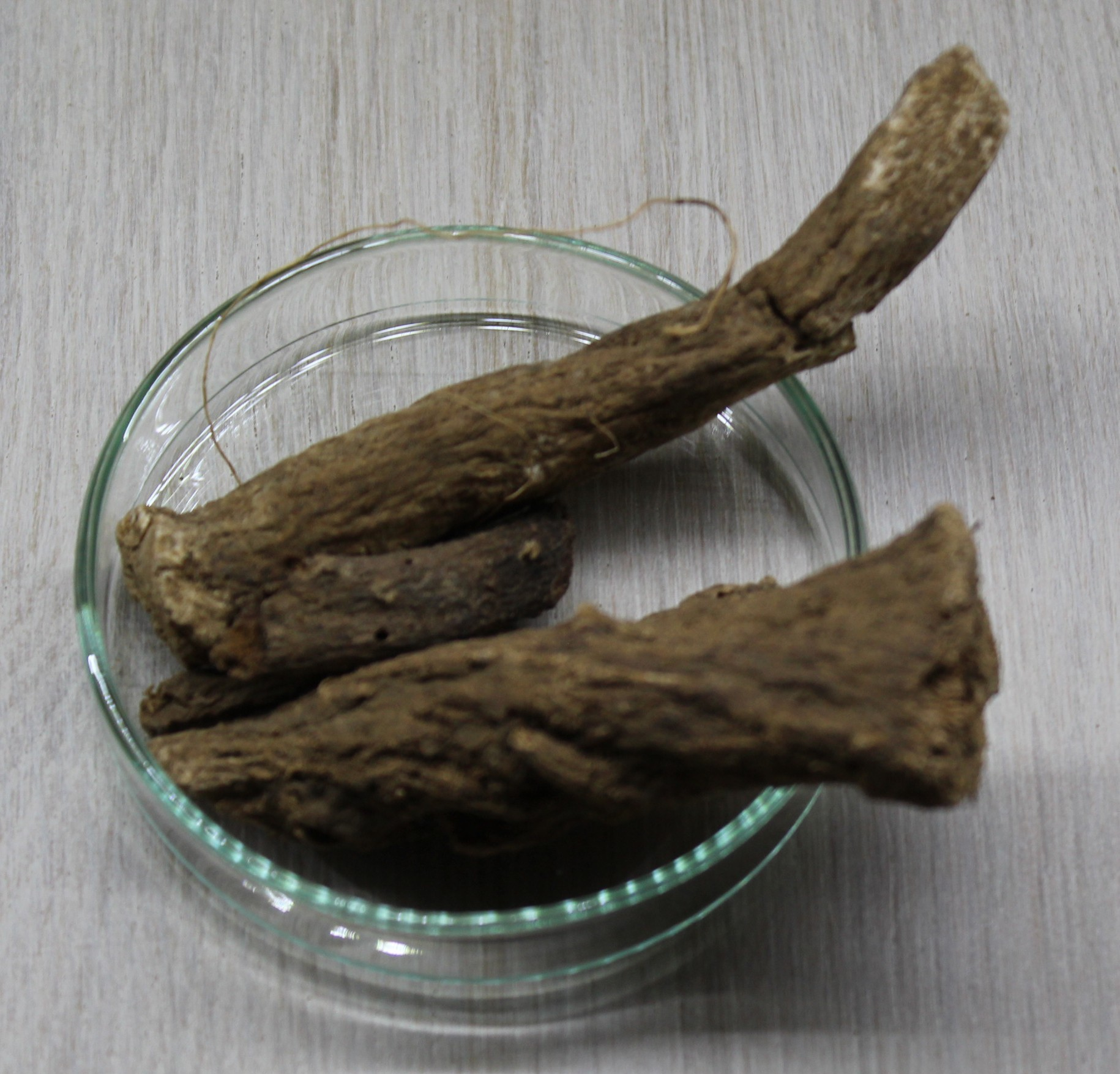
Costus

Others suggest that it may have simply referred to the root of the Bitter Kost, or what is also called Elecampane (Inula helenium), since its name amongst the Hebrews was also called "qosht," and is native to Syria and to the regions thereabout.

==== Cinnamon ====
The word used by Israel's Sages to describe this condiment is קלופה = "qelufah," which has been explained by Maimonides to mean "qishr slaykha," or what others call in Arabic, "al-qerfa," meaning Chinese cinnamon (Cinnamomum cassia, syn. Cinnamomum aromaticum), or else one of the species endemic to the Indian subcontinent (Cinnamomum tamala, or Cinnamomum zeylanicum, syn. C. verum). The famous Talmudic commentator, RASHI, also calls "qelufah" by the name of cinnamon.

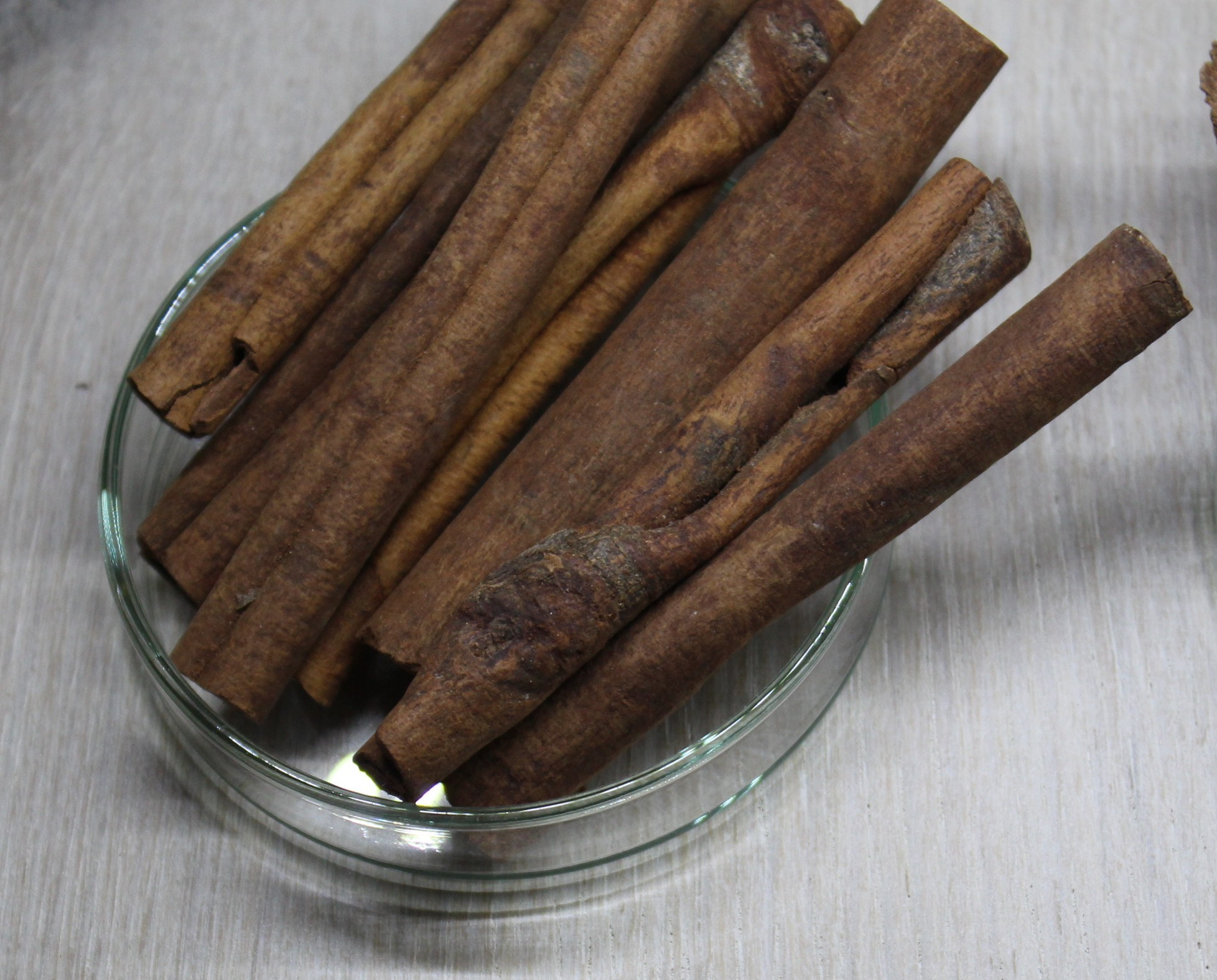
Cinnamomum verum

A lesser known opinion states that קלופה = "qelufah" was the aromatic spice, nutmeg (Myristica fragrans).

==== Karshinah soap ====
Borith Karshinah, or what is translated as "Karshinah Soap, was made by burning great quantities of barilla plants in ovens, and the dripping exudate then collected and allowed to congeal and to become stone-like, before being broken-up into smaller fragments for use as a cleansing agent. It was not necessary to turn the ashes into an actual bar soap, such as those now mixed with olive oil and lime for the production of an alkaline sodium soap. The congealed extract from the barilla plants was sufficient in cleansing the operculum. Barilla plants include such desert flora as the Jointed Anabasis (Anabasis articulata), as also other related plants, such as saltwort (Salsola kali, or Salsola soda, or Seidlitzia rosmarinus), all of which are native to the regions about Judaea and were used in soap making since time immemorial. The medieval Jewish commentator, Rashi, held a similar view, saying that the soap either comes from a place called Karshina, or else it is made from a peculiar soap herb called by that name. Elsewhere, in Malachi 3:2, Rashi explains the words "fullers' soap" as implying, in Old French, "saponaire" (Saponaria). The famous 18th century Yemenite scholar and Rabbi, Yiḥye Ṣāliḥ, also defines Karshinah as being an alkali plant called in Arabic: غاسول, any plant whose ashes are used in making a soap containing a fatty acid with soda. The Karshinah soap is not a true incense, but was rather used to scrub therewith the operculum, and thereby improve it. Maharitz, citing the Kol Bo, says that the purport of using this soap was to whiten the operculum withal, since its natural color was black and tended to darken the other constituents if not cleaned first in this manner. This was also the opinion of Rabbi David Ibn Abi-Zimra. No more than nine kabs of karshinah were needed for this purpose.

==== Cypriot wine ====
To give the operculum a stronger savor when crushed and laid to the coals, it was first steeped in a bath solution of white wine, taken from a variety of grapes known by the name Ḳafrisin, thought by some to be a Cypriot wine, possibly the Xynisteri variety said to be indigenous to Cyprus and from which they made a wine containing a high level of acidity, since they were picked early. Maharitz, citing David Abudirham, says that this wine solution may have been made by using the leaves of the caper bush (ḳafrisin), from which tonics were known to have been made. Treating the operculum in such a way, or in any white, dry wine would make its savors stronger.

The Hebrew words that describe this tonic is "yayn ḳafrīsīn" (Hebrew: יין קפריסין), a solution used in place of ammonia found in oxidized urine and meant to enhance the aroma of the operculum once it is steeped therein, whitened with soap, pounded with the other spices and laid to the coals. The omission of the use of urine in the incense production is related to it being disrespectful. The word "ḳafrīsīn," often used in Modern Hebrew for the isle of Cyprus, is actually a modern designation for the place, seeing that Cyprus was called formerly Ḳūpros (Hebrew: קופרוס). The Jerusalem Talmud says that a capacity of only three seahs and three kabs of Cypriot wine was needed to steep seventy maneh-weight of operculum (See infra for an explanation of the maneh-weight).

== Relative proportion of each spice ==
The Talmud brings down the proportion in weight of each of the eleven ingredients used in the Holy Incense. Compounded once a year, a total of 368 maneh-weight of spices were used throughout the entire solar year. One maneh, or what was a standard weight equivalent to 100 denarius (in weight), about 806.4 grams (28.44 ounces), was offered each day upon the golden altar - half in the morning, and the other half toward the evening, making a total of 365 maneh-weight for each of the 365 days of the year. An additional three manehs were offered with the portion of incense given on the most venerable day of the Jewish year, the Day of Atonement.

The first four spices (aromatic gum resin, operculum, galbanum and frankincense) comprised the greatest weight. Each consisted of seventy maneh-weight, for a combined weight of 280. After each spice was pounded separately, they were mixed together. To these were added myrrh, cassia, spikenard (valerian) and saffron, each consisting of sixteen maneh-weight for a total weight of sixty-four manehs. These, too, were pounded separately before being mixed together. The combined weight now came to 344, although the first four spices were, in weight, more than the last four spices by a ratio of about 4 1/3 to 1. Costus was added unto these, being only twelve maneh-weight. The previous four spices mentioned were, in weight, more than the costus by a ratio of 1 1/3 to 1. The combined weight now came to 356. Unto these spices was added cinnamon, having a quantity of three maneh-weight. The previous spice named was, in weight, more than the cinnamon by a ratio of 4 to 1. The combined weight now came to 359. Finally, unto these spices was added nine maneh-weight of agarwood, which last spice was also more in weight than the cinnamon by a ratio of 3 to 1. The entire weight accruing therefrom was three-hundred and sixty-eight manehs (296.75 kilograms (654.2 lb)), or, based on Saadia Gaon's calculation in dirhams, amounted to 109.296 kilograms (240.96 lb). A quarter kab of salt was added to the pounded incense, as well as a dash of ambergris absolute, believed to be the "Jordan amber."

A question came to the fore in the course of their studies, whereby the Rabbis had asked whether or not it would be permissible for the apothecary to compound half of the total weight normally compounded in making the incense. The answer given was unequivocal, namely: to make half of 368 maneh-weight, or only 184 maneh-weight, of spices compounded together is still permissible, on the condition that the spices are compounded with the same ratio. It was not clear, however, if it were permissible to make a quarter or a third of its normal weight.

Excursus: The following account, taken from Vendyl Jones' Report on the Excavations at Qumran, is based on the work of Dr. Marvin Antelmen, Chemical Advisor at Weizmann Institute of Science, Rehovot. In it, Dr. Antelmen cites co-worker and researcher on the chemical analysis conducted by him on the cache of spices discovered at Qumran and believed to have been the residue of holy incense stored-away after the destruction of the Temple in Jerusalem in 68 / 70 CE.
"The aroma released from the spice compound during its processing was profuse and almost immediate. It initially saturated my hands as well as the clothes that I was wearing. Within a matter of minutes my laboratory and the surrounding area (for an area of several meters) was affected by the scent released from the spices... On the first day of processing, the aroma was so intense that I could almost taste it... Upon my return home that evening, the scent that had attached itself on my body and clothes was really apparent to both my wife and daughter. During the course of the week, the odor lessened slightly but was still noticeable in and around my lab. Within a few weeks the distinct aroma of the spices diminished to a freshness or cleanness of the air in my lab and the surrounding area. This aroma was in evidence, if even so slightly, for approximately two months."

== Bibliography ==
- Amar, Z. (1997). "The Incense Spices according to Rabbi Saadia Gaon (סממני הקטורת על פי ר' סעדיה גאון)". Sinai (in Hebrew). 118 (1–6). Mossad Harav Kook: 129–139.
- Abu-Rabiʻa, ʻAref (2001). Bedouin Century: Education and Development among the Negev Tribes in the Twentieth Century. New York. doi:10.3167/9781571818324. ISBN 978-1-57181-832-4. OCLC 47119256.
- Aëtius of Amida (1549). Gryphius, Venetiis (ed.). Sixteen Books on Medicine (Aetii Medici Graeci Contractae ex Veteribus Medicinae Sermones XVI) (in Latin). Vol. 1–2. University and State Library Düsseldorf.
- Al-Fasi, D. (1936–1945). Solomon L. Skoss (ed.). The Hebrew-Arabic Dictionary of the Bible, Known as 'Kitāb Jāmiʿ al-Alfāẓ' (Agron) (in Hebrew). Vol. 1–2. New Haven: Yale University Press.
- Amar, Z. (2002). The Book of Incense (Sefer Haqetoret) (in Hebrew). Tel-Aviv: Tel-Aviv University. ISBN 9657163048. OCLC 233392324.
- Amar, Z.; Serri, Yaron (2004). The Land of Israel and Syria as Described by al-Tamimi – Jerusalem Physician of the 10th Century (in Hebrew). Ramat-Gan. ISBN 965-226-252-8. -- (OCLC 607157392)
- Amar, Z. (2012). Flora of the Bible - A New Investigation Aimed at Identifying All of the Plants of the Bible in Light of Jewish Sources and Scientific Research (in Hebrew). Jerusalem: Rubin Mass Ltd. OCLC 783455868.
- Basker, D.; Negbi, M. (1983). "Uses of Saffron". Economic Botany. 37 (2): 228–236. Bibcode:1983EcBot..37..228B. doi:10.1007/BF02858789. JSTOR 4254486. S2CID 40880131.
- Bower, A.; Campbell, John; Psalmanazar, George; Sale, George; Shelvocke, George; Swinton, John (1747). An Universal History, from the Earliest Account of Time to the Present; Compiled from Original Authors and Illustrated with Maps, Cuts, Notes, Chronological and other Tables (part i). Vol. 16. London.
- Chananel (1990). David Metzger (ed.). Pirushei Rabbeinu Chananel bar Chushiel Le-Talmud (Tractate Berakhot) (in Hebrew). Jerusalem: Machon 'Lev Sameach'. OCLC 122703105.
- Dalman, Gustaf (2013). Work and Customs in Palestine. Vol. I/2. Translated by Nadia Abdulhadi Sukhtian. Ramallah: Dar Al Nasher. ISBN 9789950385-01-6. OCLC 1040774903.
- Dioscorides (1959). The Greek Herbal of Dioscorides (De materia medica). Translated by Robert Gunther. New York: Hafner Pub. Co. (first printed in 1933)
- Dioscorides (1902), "Styrax", in Julius Berendes (ed.), De materia medica (PDF), PharmaWiki.ch, archived from the original (PDF) on 2015-09-24
- Edwards, Sue (1995). Flora of Ethiopia and Eritrea. Addis Ababa: Addis Ababa University. OCLC 1051310178.
- Encyclopaedia Judaica (1974). Maaleh Ashan. Vol. 8 (3 ed.). Jerusalem: Keter Publishing House.
- Erler, Jochen (August 2001), "Vines, Grapes & Wines in Cyprus", in Christodoulou, Tony (ed.), Sunjet magazine, Cyprus
- Gamliel, Shalom, ed. (1988), Al-Jāma' - Ha-Ma'asef, Hebrew-Arabic lexicon, Jerusalem: Mechon Shalom Le-Shivtei Yeshurun, OCLC 951798517
- Göttsch, Eggert (1991). "Traditional Aromatic and Perfume Plants in Central Ethiopia (A Botanical and Ethno-Historical Survey)". Journal of Ethiopian Studies. 19. Cambridge University Press: 81–90. JSTOR 41965939.
- Hai Gaon (1924), "Hai Gaon's Commentary on Seder Taharot", in Epstein, J.N. (ed.), The Geonic Commentary on Seder Taharot - Attributed to Rabbi Hai Gaon (in Hebrew), vol. 2, Berlin: Itzkowski, OCLC 13977130
- Hill, J. (1751). A History of the Materia Medica. London. OCLC 642254584.
- Howes, F.N. (1950). "Age-Old Resins of the Mediterranean Region and Their Uses". Economic Botany. 4 (4): 307–316. Bibcode:1950EcBot...4..307H. doi:10.1007/BF02985086. S2CID 45182735.
- Ibn Abi-Zimra, David (1749). David Ashkenazi (ed.). The Responsa of the Radbaz (in Hebrew). Vol. 1. Venice., s.v. Part II, responsum # 653 (reprinted in Israel, n.d.)
- Ibn Ǧanāḥ, Yonah (1896). A. Berliner (ed.). Book of the Roots (Sepher Haschoraschim) (in Hebrew). Berlin.
- Ibn Rushd (1939). José María Fórneas Besteiro; Camilo Alvarez de Morales (eds.). Kitāb al-Kulliyyāt fī l-Ṭibb ابن رشد - كتاب الكُليات في الطب (in Arabic and Spanish). Vol. 1–2. Madrid: Consejo Superior de Investigaciones Científicas. OCLC 925575956.
- Isidore of Seville (2006). "XVII on Aromatics". In Stephen A. Barney; W. J. Lewis; J. A. Beach; Oliver Berghof (eds.). The Etymologies of Isidore of Seville. Cambridge: Cambridge University Press.
- Jastrow, M., ed. (2006), Dictionary of the Targumim, the Talmud Babli and Yerushalmi, and the Midrashic Literature, Peabody, Mass.: Hendrickson Publishers, OCLC 614562238
- Jones, W. (1790). "On the Spikenard of the Ancients". Asiatick Researches Journal. 2: 405–417.
- Jones, W. (1795). "On the Spikenard of the Ancients". Asiatick Researches Journal. 4: 109–118.
- Josephus (1981). Josephus Complete Works. Translated by William Whiston. Grand Rapids, Michigan: Kregel Publications. ISBN 0-8254-2951-X.
- Kauz, Ralph (2010). Aspects of the Maritime Silk Road: From the Persian Gulf to the East China Sea. Vol. 10 of East Asian Economic and Socio-cultural Studies – East Asian Maritime History. Otto Harrassowitz Verlag. p. 130. ISBN 978-3-447-06103-2.
- Kislev, Itamar (2008). "The Commentaries of Ibn Ezra and Rashbam and the Dispute over the Ingredients of the Altar Incense (הזיקה בין פירושיהם של ראב"ע ורשב"ם: סוגיית מרכיבי הקטורת)". Tarbiẕ (in Hebrew). 78 (1). Mandel Institute for Jewish Studies: 61–80. JSTOR 23609048.
- Macht, D.I. (1928). The Holy Incense: A Botanical, Pharmacological and Archaeological Appreciation of the Bible. Baltimore: Waverly Press, Inc.
- Maimonides (1956). 'The Guide for the Perplexed' by Moses Maimonides. Translated by Michael Friedländer (2nd ed.). New York: Dover Publications. OCLC 716028723.
- Maimonides (1967). Mishnah, with Maimonides' Commentary (in Hebrew). Vol. 3. Translated by Yosef Qafih. Jerusalem: Mossad Harav Kook.
- Maimonides (1974). Sefer Mishneh Torah - HaYad Ha-Chazakah (Maimonides' Code of Jewish Law) (in Hebrew). Vol. 1–7. Jerusalem: Pe'er HaTorah.
- Maimonides (1985), "Hil. Berakhot", in Qafih, Y. (ed.), Mishneh Torah (in Hebrew), vol. 2, Kiryat-Ono: Mekhon mishnat ha-Rambam, OCLC 19158717
- Markson, I. (1943), "מר דרור (Exo. 30:23), Explained by Saadya and his Successors", in Rosenthal, E.I.J. (ed.), Saadya Studies, Manchester
- Mishnah (1977). Herbert Danby (ed.). The Mishnah (12th ed.). Oxford: Oxford University Press. ISBN 0-19-815402-X.
- Morrison, Chanan (2006). Gold from the Land of Israel: A New Light on the Weekly Torah Portion from the Writings of Rabbi Abraham Isaac HaKohen Kook (in Hebrew). Jerusalem / Brooklyn: Urim Publications. ISBN 965-7108-92-6.
- Muntner, Suessmann (1963). Moshe Ben Maimon (Maimonides) Medical Works (in Hebrew). Jerusalem. OCLC 311644263.
- Nachmanides (1993). RAMBAN's Commentary on the Pentateuch (in Hebrew). Jerusalem.
- Nathan ben Abraham (1955), "Perush Shishah Sidrei Mishnah - A Commentary on the Six Orders of the Mishnah", in Sachs, Mordecai Yehudah Leib (ed.), The Six Orders of the Mishnah: with the Commentaries of the Rishonim (in Hebrew), Jerusalem: El ha-Meqorot, OCLC 233403923
- Nathanel ben Yisha'yah (1983). Yosef Qafih (ed.). Meor ha-Afelah (in Hebrew) (2nd ed.). Kiryat Ono. (first written in 1328 CE)
- Ovadiah di Bertinoro (1978). Commentary on 'Shisha Sidrei Mishnah' (in Hebrew). Vol. 1. Jerusalem: Eshkol. OCLC 233308344.
- Overduin, Floris (2014). Nicander of Colophon's Theriaca. Leiden: Brill Publishers. ISBN 9789004271210.
- Payne Smith, J. (1903). A compendious Syriac Dictionary: founded upon the Thesaurus Syriacus of R. Payne Smith (in Syriac and English). Oxford: Clarendon Press. (J.P. Margoliouth's supplement)
- Pliny the Elder (1968). H. Rackham (ed.). Natural History (in Latin and English). Vol. 4. London: William Heinemann.
- Qafih, Y. (1963). Rabbi Saadia Gaon's Commentaries (Pirushei Rabbeinu Saadia Gaon) (in Hebrew). Jerusalem: Mossad Harav Kook.
- Ratzaby, Yehuda (2018), "Ancient Customs of the Yemenite-Jewish Community", in Rachel Yedid; Danny Bar-Maoz (eds.), Ascending the Palm Tree: An Anthology of the Yemenite Jewish Heritage, Rehovot: E'ele BeTamar, OCLC 1041776317
- Saadia (1962), "Saadia Gaon's Arabic Translation of Song of Songs (Tafsir)", in Qafih, Y. (ed.), Chamesh Megillot (The Five Scrolls), Jerusalem: Ha-Aggudah Le-Hatzalat Ginzei Teiman
- Saadia (1968), "Saadia Gaon's Arabic Translation of the Pentateuch (Tafsir)", in Shalom ben Yosef 'Iraqi Cohen-Tzedek; Avraham ben Hayim Naddaf (eds.), Sefer Keter Torah, called Taj, vol. 1–2 (2nd ed.), Jerusalem (first printed in 1894)
- Saadia Gaon (1984). Yosef Qafih (ed.). Rabbi Saadia Gaon's Commentaries on the Pentateuch (in Hebrew) (4 ed.). Jerusalem: Mossad Harav Kook. OCLC 232667032.
- Saleh, Y. (1979). Shimon Tzalach (ed.). The Complete 'Tiklal 'Eṣ Ḥayyim (in Hebrew). Vol. 1–4. Jerusalem: Ḳeren Agudat ha-Maharits. OCLC 122866057.
- Saleh, Y. (1983). Yaakov Qarwani (ed.). The Original Tiklāl Etz Ḥayyim of Maharitz (in Hebrew). Vol. 1 (facsimile ed.). Rosh Ha-Ayin.
- Theophrastus (1916). Hort, Arthur (ed.). Theophrastus: Enquiry into Plants. Vol. 1–2 (Loeb Classical Library ed.). London and New York: William Heinemann and G.P. Putnam's Sons.
- Ulysis Aldrovandus (n.d.). Natural History (De Testaceis).
