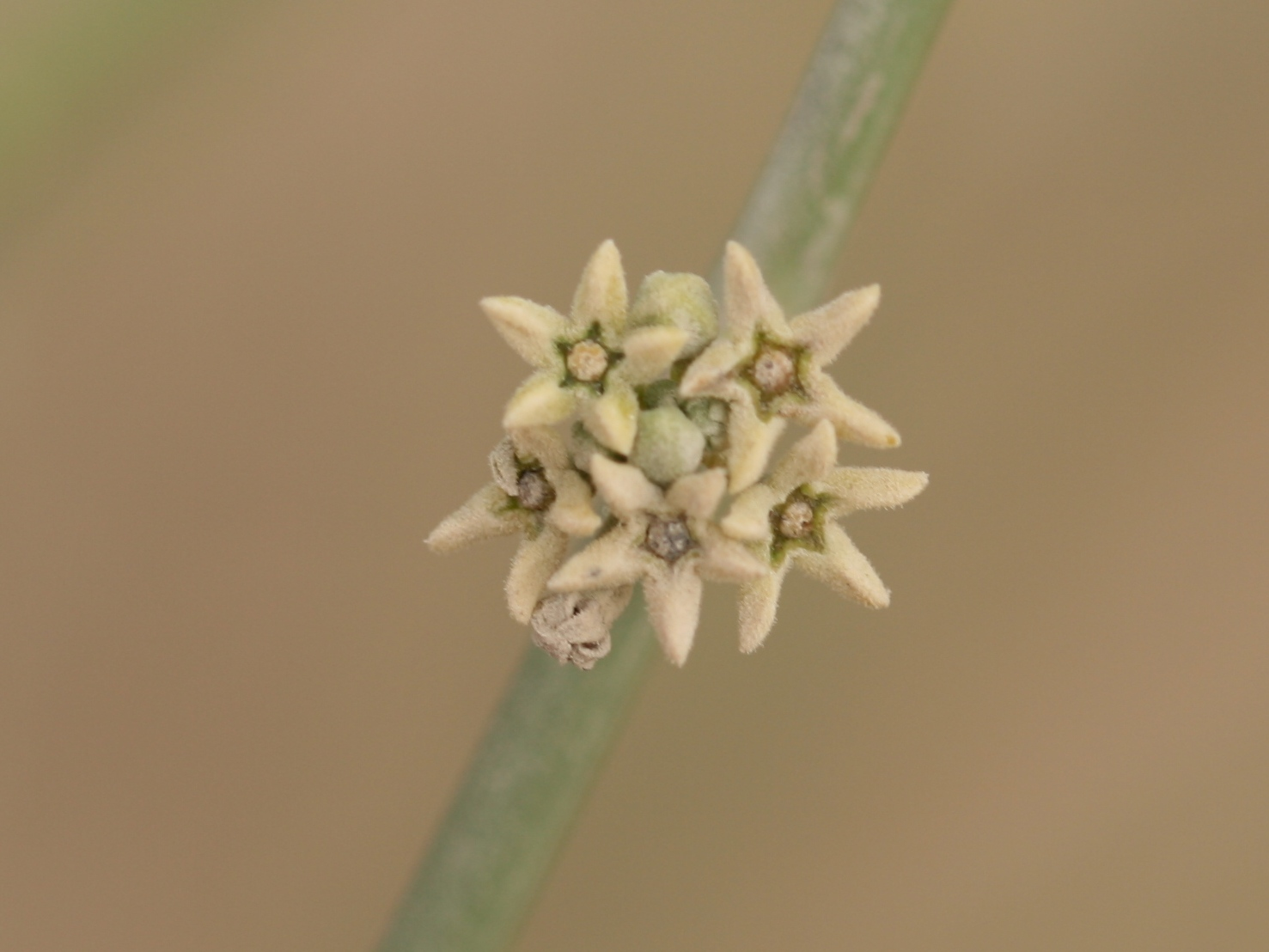
- Leptadenia pyrotechnica

Scientific classification
- Kingdom: Plantae
- Clade: Tracheophytes
- Clade: Angiosperms
- Clade: Eudicots
- Clade: Asterids
- Order: Gentianales
- Family: Apocynaceae
- Subfamily: Asclepiadoideae
- Tribe: Ceropegieae
- Genus: Leptadenia; R.Br.

Synonyms
- Barrowia Decne.; Curinila Schult.; Curnilia Raf.; Orthanthera Wight; Reinera Dennst.

= Leptadenia =

Genus of plants

Leptadenia is a genus of plants in the family Apocynaceae, first described as a genus in 1810. It is native to Africa, including Madagascar, as well as southwest Asia, the Indian subcontinent, and Indochina.

== Species ==
Nine species are accepted.

- Leptadenia albida (Schinz) Bruyns – southwestern Angola, Namibia, and northwestern Cape Provinces
- Leptadenia arborea (Forssk.) Schweinf. – Sahara, Sahel, and Arabian Peninsula
- Leptadenia gossweileri (C.Norman) Bruyns – southern Angola
- Leptadenia jasminiflora (Decne.) Bruyns – southern Democratic Republic of the Congo to South Africa
- Leptadenia lanceolata (Poir.) Goyder – North Africa and western and eastern tropical Africa
- Leptadenia madagascariensis Decne. – Madagascar
- Leptadenia pyrotechnica (Forssk.) Decne. – widespread from Algeria to India
- Leptadenia reticulata (Retz.) Wight & Arn. – Indian Subcontinent, Myanmar, and Cambodia
- Leptadenia viminea (Wight) Bruyns – western and central Himalayas and India

formerly included

transferred to other genera (Genianthus, Periploca)

1. Leptadenia elliptica Blume synonym of Genianthus ellipticus (Blume) Bakh. f.
2. Leptadenia visciformis Vatke synonym of Periploca visciformis (Vatke) K. Schum.
