= Showbread Institute =

Israeli research institute

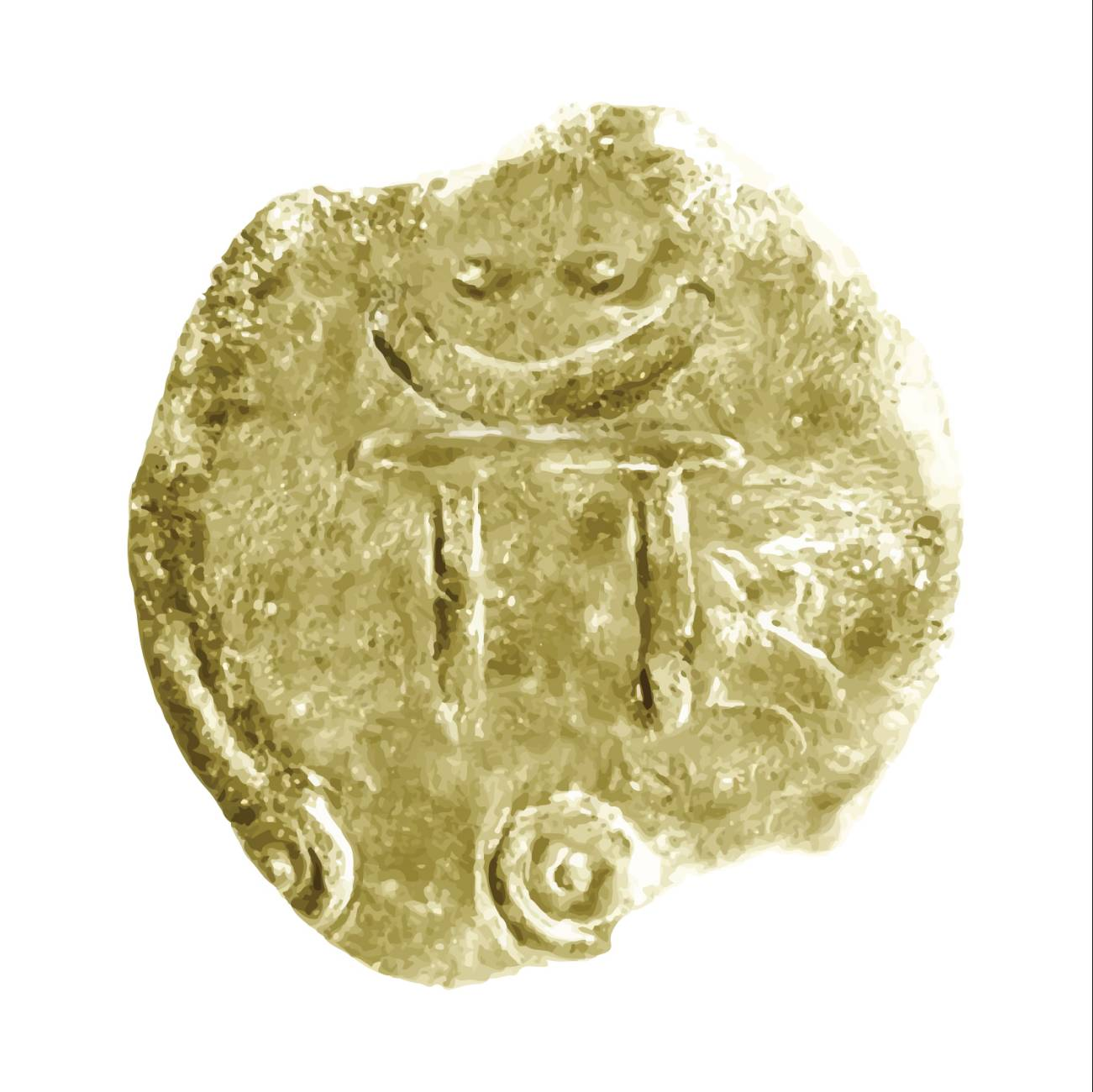

The Showbread Institute (in Hebrew - Machon Lechem Hapanim מכון לחם הפנים) is a research institute dedicated to researching the biblical Showbread (also called Shewbread, Face Bread.).

Founded in 2018 and located in Karnei Shomron, West Bank, the Showbread Institute is run by Eliezer Meir (Les) Saidel, a Temple researcher and master baker.

Using multiple modern scientific disciplines, coupled with an in-depth study of scripture and commentaries, the ShowBread Institute is attempting to reconstruct the biblical Showbread and uncover its secrets and hidden symbolism.

== Media Appearances ==
1. "Mishpacha Magazine - Bread of a Thousand Faces".

2. "Jerusalem Post newspaper - Showing the World the Showbread".

3. "Five Towns Jewish Times - Temple Breads Workshop".

4. "Love Love Israel review".

5. "Weekly Blitz - Temple Bread Baking in Biblical Israel".

6. "Haaretz newspaper - Baking Sacramental Bread".

7. "Mosaic Magazine - A Baker Tries to Uncover the Lost Recipe of the Temple's Sacred Bread".

8. "Daf Yomi.com - The Shape of the Showbread".

9. "Alliance Magazine - Un boulanger israélien sur les traces des Pains de Proposition bibliques".

10. "PaleoJudaica.com - Resurrecting the Showbread?".

11. "RakbeIsrael.buzz - Un couple de boulanger israélien décide de reproduire le Lehem Panim utilisé pendant le Beth Hamikdash".

12. "Morasha.com - Descobrindo o Israel Bíblico".

== Notes ==
.
