= Leptadenia madagascariensis =

Scientific classification
- Kingdom: Plantae
- Clade: Tracheophytes
- Clade: Angiosperms
- Clade: Eudicots
- Clade: Asterids
- Order: Gentianales
- Family: Apocynaceae
- Genus: Leptadenia
- Species: L. madagascariensis

Binomial name
- Leptadenia madagascariensis Decne.

Synonyms
- Leptadenia bojeriana Decne.

Species of plant

Leptadenia madagascariensis is a species of flowering plant in the family Apocynaceae, native to Madagascar and the Mozambique Channel Islands (Juan de Nova Island).
