= House of Avtinas =

According to the Talmud, the House of Avtinas or Eutinos (Hebrew:בֵּית אַבְטִינָס) was responsible for compounding the ketoret, the incense offered on the incense altar outside the Holy of Holies in the Temple in Jerusalem.

The Talmud praised the Eutinos family for never permitting the family's female members to be seen wearing perfume to avoid any possible suspicion that they might be appropriating Temple resources for their personal use. The Talmud relates that they knew a secret ingredient called Maaleh Ashan that could make the smoke from the incense rise straight up in a column. They refused to disclose the secret, which became lost following the destruction of the Second Temple in 70 CE. According to the Mishna (Yoma 3:11), the Rabbis criticized the House of Eutinos (among others) for their refusal to share the knowledge of the Maaleh Ashan. The Gemorah (Yoma 38a) states that the House Eutinos defended themselves to the sages because they feared that if they revealed the secret, it would be used for idolatry (Yoma 38a); there are differing traditions as to whether the Rabbis accepted this defence and removed the censure from Eutinos.

The Talmud relates that the Temple officers once attempted to replace the House of Eutinos. The replacement workers could not compound the incense in a way that made the smoke from the offering rise in the expected manner. The Jerusalem Talmud relates in Shekalim 5:1:20, "When the Sages realized the situation, they said, everything which the Holy One, praise to Him, created, he created to His glory; as it is said, all which is called by My Name, etc. They sent after them, but they refused to come until they doubled their wages."

The phrase "Who created everything for His Glory" is used in the first blessing of the Sheva Brachot "Seven Blessings" at a Jewish wedding, and in the birkat hamazon during the three- to seven-day honeymoon period afterwards. Commentators connect the use of this phrase in this Talmudic passage to its use in the marriage ceremony to illustrate interpretive ideas—that everyone has unique talents which must be recognized, that it is sage to accept with grace what one cannot change—connecting the stories of the House of Eutinos and House of Garmu with wisdom and insight necessary to maintain a harmonious marriage.

Tractate Shekalim 5:1:21 relates another story about the House of Eutinos:

Rebbi Aqiba said, Simeon ben Lagos told me, I was collecting herbs, I and a youth from the family Eutinos, when I saw him crying and laughing. I said to him, my son, why did you cry? He said to me, about the prestige of my family which is diminished. And why did you laugh? About the glory prepared for the Just in the future world. [What did you see?] There is smoke-creating herb before me! I said to him, my son, show it to me. He answered me, I have a tradition from my ancestors not to show it to any creature.
