= House of Garmu =

According to the Talmud, the House of Garmu was responsible for baking the Showbread offered in the Temple of Jerusalem. The Talmud praised the Garmu family for never permitting their children to be seen eating white bread, to avoid any possible suspicion that they might be appropriating Temple resources for their own personal use. The Talmud relates that they had a secret method of baking the Showbread in a way that preserved its freshness so that it remained fresh even after having been left on the Table for a week. They refused to disclose the secret and it became lost following the Second Temple's destruction in 70 CE.

The Talmud relates that the officers of the Temple once attempted to replace the House of Garmu, but the replacement workers were unable to bake it in a way which preserved its freshness. The Talmud relates said that:

When the Sages learned of the matter, they said "All that the Holy One, Blessed Be He created he created for His glory, as it is said (Proverbs 16:4) "Everything God made for His sake." The Sages sent after them, but they did not want to come back until [the Sages] doubled their wages. Jerusalem Talmud Shekalim 5:1 (Schottenstein Edition 14a)

The phrase "Who created everything for His Glory" is used in the first blessing of the Sheva Brachot (Seven Blessings) at a Jewish wedding ceremony (and in the Birkat HaMazon (Grace after meals) during the 3-7 day honeymoon period afterwards. Commentators connect the use of this phrase in this Talmudic passage to its use in the marriage ceremony to illustrate interpretive ideas -- that everyone has unique talents which must be recognized, that it is sage to accept with grace what one cannot change -- connecting the story of the House of Garmu with wisdom and insight necessary to maintain a harmonious marriage.
