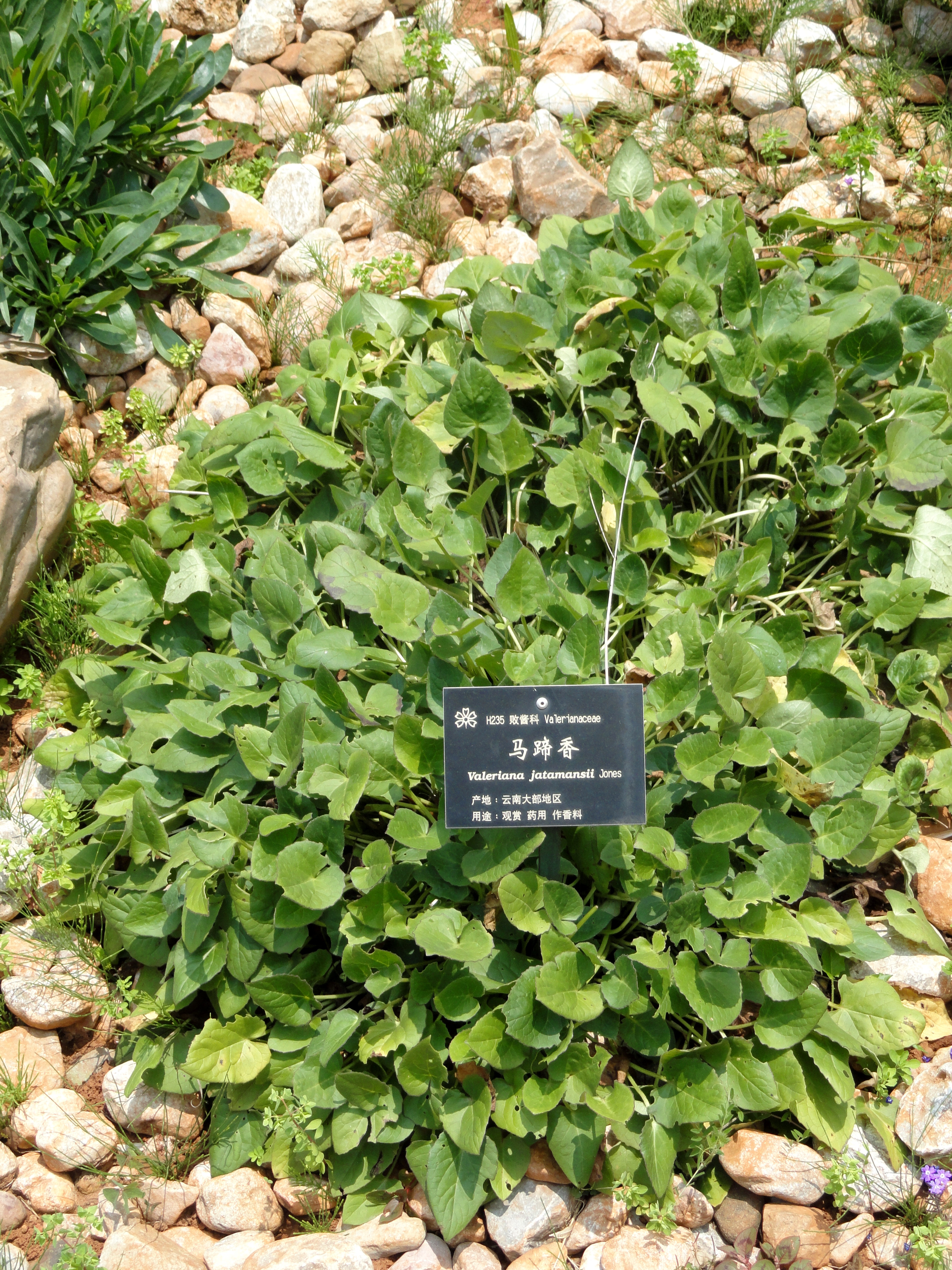

Scientific classification
- Kingdom: Plantae
- Clade: Tracheophytes
- Clade: Angiosperms
- Clade: Eudicots
- Clade: Asterids
- Order: Dipsacales
- Family: Caprifoliaceae
- Genus: Valeriana
- Species: V. jatamansi

Binomial name
- Valeriana jatamansi Jones ex Roxb.

Synonyms
- Valeriana harmsii Graebn.; Valeriana hygrobia Briq.; Valeriana mairei H.Lév.; Valeriana spica Vahl; Valeriana violifolia Griff.; Valeriana wallichii DC.

= Valeriana jatamansi =

Species of flowering plant

Valeriana jatamansi, formerly known as Valeriana wallichii, is a rhizome herb of the genus Valeriana and the family Valerianaceae also called Indian Valerian or Tagar-Ganthoda, not to be confused with ganthoda, the root of Indian long pepper. It is an herb useful in Ayurvedic medicine used as an analeptic, antispasmodic, carminative, sedative, stimulant, stomachic, and nervine.

The genus Valeriana, with about 200 species, belongs to the family Valerianaceae and has a distribution throughout the world. The Indian Valerian has long been used in Ayurveda (Charak Samhita and Susruta) and Unani systems of medicine, which describe its use in obesity, skin disease, insanity, epilepsy and snake poisoning. The crude drugs from roots/ rhizomes and Valerian derived phytomedicines are used as mild sedatives in pharmaceutical industry. The activity is largely attributed to the presence of valepotriates.

== General distribution ==
Valeriana jatamansi is native to India, Nepal, Pakistan and China. As an important substitute for the European V. officinalis, it has been traditionally used in treatment of sleep problems, obesity, nervous disorders and snake poisoning and skin diseases. Uttarakhand, part of Indian North western Himalaya, represents a mountainous region that encompasses agroclimatic conditions ranging from tropical to alpine and, thus, possesses a rich biodiversity. Valeriana, the major genus in the family Valerianaceae, is characterized by perennials that have three stamens without spurs on the slightly swollen base of the corolla, with a short and often strong-smelling root stalk. Strachey reported in 1918 the occurrence of five Valeriana species, V. dioica L., V. pyrolaefolia, V. stracheyi, V. jatamansi DC., and V. hardwickii, at elevations ranging from 1500 ± 4300 m. A re-investigation of the morphology, distribution, and biodiversity of the Indian Valerianaceae, however, showed a total of 16 species/subspecies, of which six, namely V. wallichii DC. (V. jatamansi), V. himalayana (V. dioica L.), V. pyrolaefolia, V. mussooriensis, V. hardwickii. var. hardwickii, and V. hardwickii. var. arnottiana (Wt. C.B.) occur in Uttarakhand, Himalaya.
