= Maaleh Ashan =

Herb

The Hebrew term maaleh ashan is the traditional name of an herb which according to the Talmud was an ingredient of the ketoret, the incense offered in the Temple in Jerusalem. It was said to cause the smoke from the incense-offering to rise straight up.

According to the Talmud, the House of Avtinas, which compounded the incense, kept the identity of maaleh ashan a secret which became lost following the destruction of the Second Temple in 70 CE.

According to the Temple Institute, "In our own time, some have speculated that this may be the plant Leptadenia pyrotechnica, which contains nitric acid."

== See also ==
- House of Avtinas
- Korban
- Asclepiadoideae
