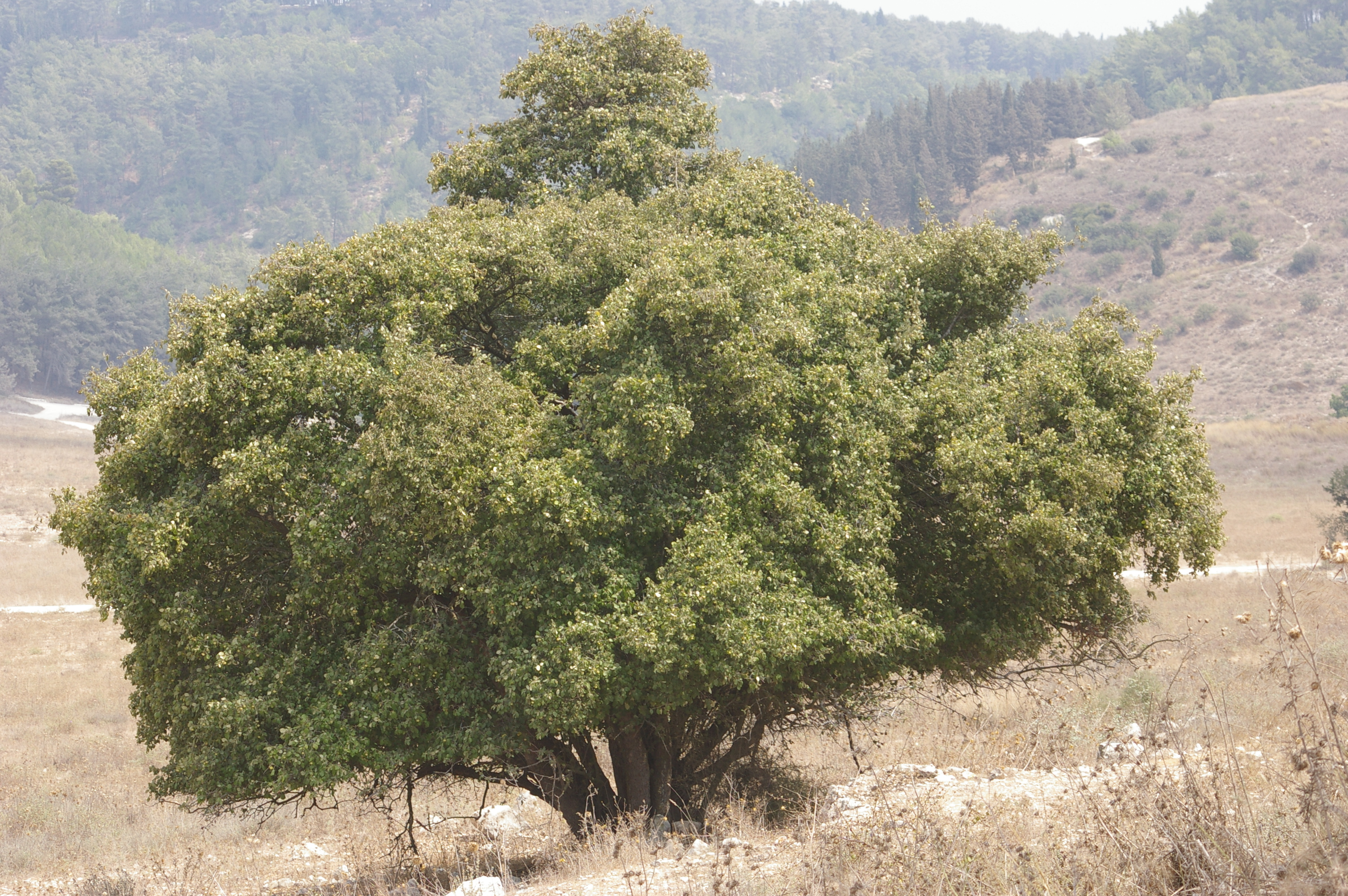
- S. officinalis in the Menashe hills of Israel

Scientific classification
- Kingdom: Plantae
- Clade: Embryophytes
- Clade: Tracheophytes
- Clade: Spermatophytes
- Clade: Angiosperms
- Clade: Eudicots
- Clade: Asterids
- Order: Ericales
- Family: Styracaceae
- Genus: Styrax
- Species: S. officinalis

Binomial name
- Styrax officinalis L.

Synonyms
- Styrax officinarum Crantz; Styrax cotinifolius Salisb.

= Styrax officinalis =

Species of shrub

Styrax officinalis, commonly called the storax tree or snowdrop bush, is a species of shrub in the family Styracaceae.

== Description ==
Styrax officinalis is a deciduous shrub reaching a height of 2–5 metres (7–16 ft). It has a simple, relaxed growth form with tight, dark bark on its basal stems. The very thin elliptical leaves are 5–10 cm (2–4 in) long by 3.5–5.5 cm (1 1/2–2 in) wide. They are alternate and widely spaced on thin, reddish stems, with a small, very light green, stalked axillary bud associated with each leaf.

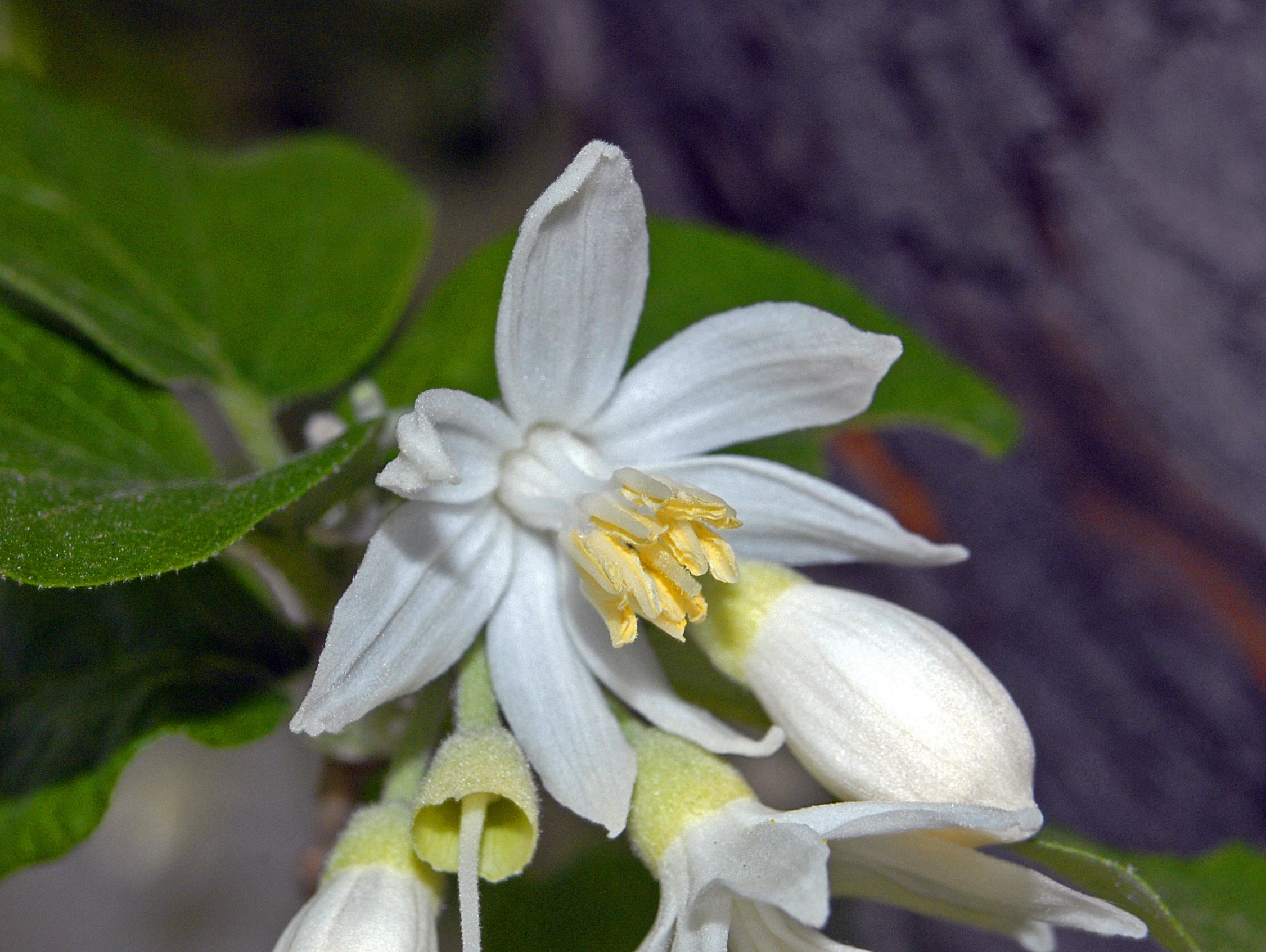
Close-up on a flower of Styrax officinalis

The inflorescence is short and bears few flowers. The flowers themselves are axillary, bell-shaped, white, fragrant, and approximately 2 cm (1 in) long. The corolla features 5–7 petals surrounding many yellow anthers, and the calyx is 5-lobed. The flowering period extends from spring to summer (May–June).

== Taxonomy ==
Three taxa formerly treated as subspecies—Styrax officinalis subsp. redivivus and Styrax officinalis subsp. fulvescens (both native to California), and Styrax officinalis subsp. jaliscana (native to Mexico)—were historically included within this species. However, molecular analysis has shown that they have diverged sufficiently to be recognized as separate species, S. redivivus and S. jaliscana; this taxonomic separation is now widely accepted.

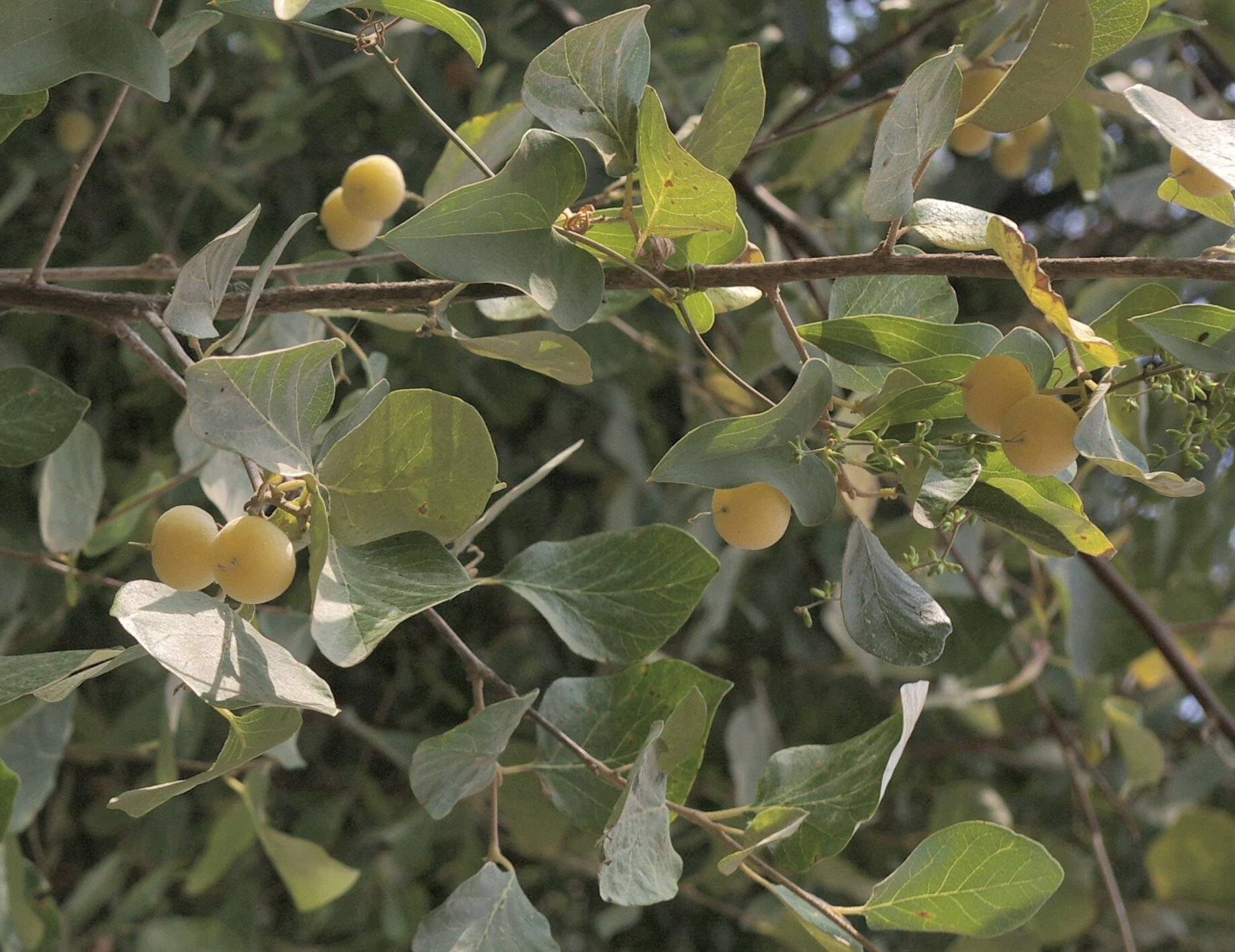
Fruit

== Distribution ==
This species is native to southern Europe and the Middle East. It prefers dry rocky slopes, open woods, and thickets at altitudes of up to 1,500 metres (5,000 ft) above sea level.

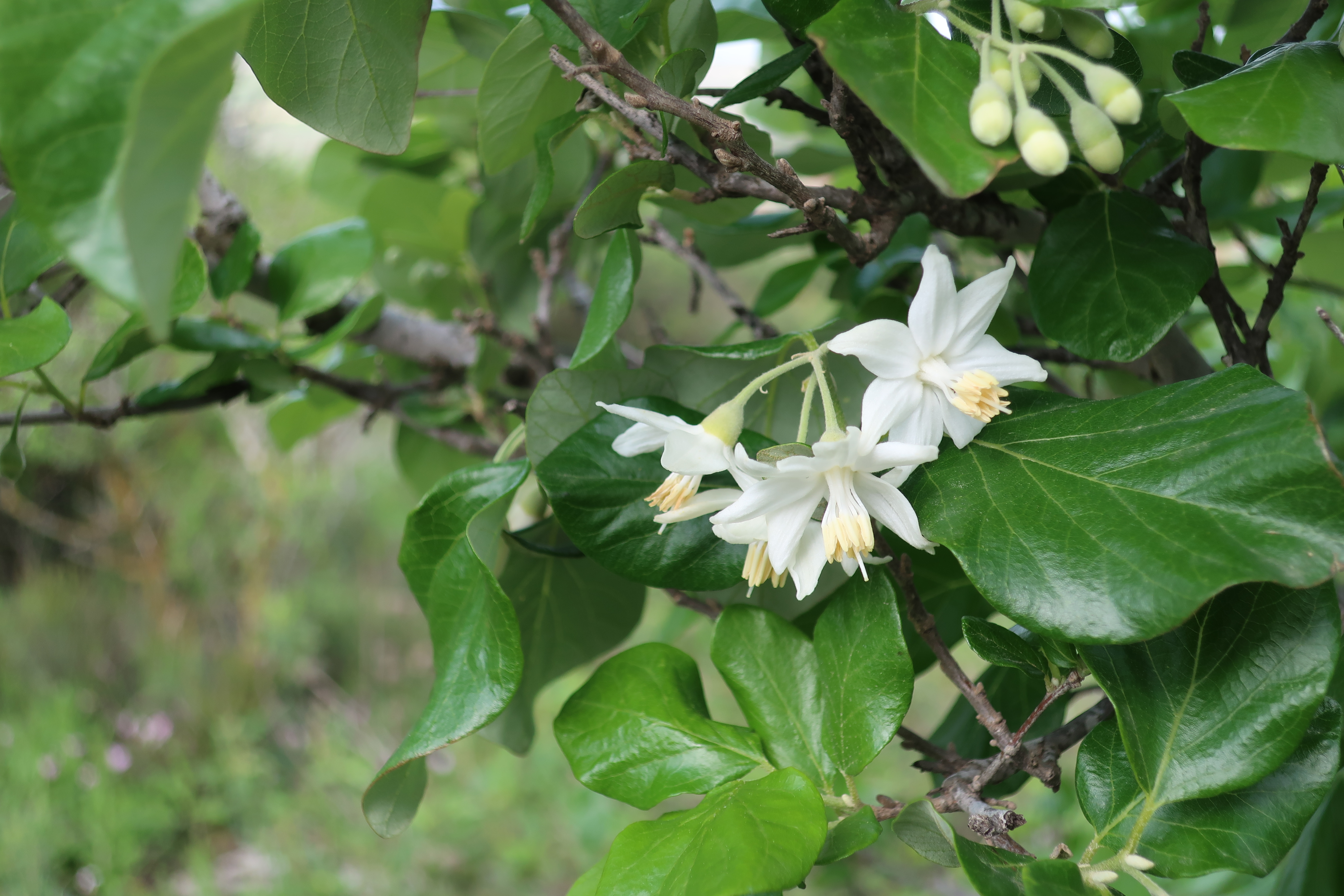
Storax tree blossoms

== Uses ==
This plant is the historical source of styrax (storax), a herbal medicine and perfume resin known since antiquity; it was formally identified as such by Linnaeus. Some scholars believe its oleoresin was the stacte used alongside frankincense, galbanum, and onycha to formulate Ketoret, the sacred Tabernacle incense offering of the Old Testament.

The philosopher Averroës wrote regarding the reddish-brown oleoresin exudate taken from the storax tree. Similarly, Ibn Ǧanāḥ (c. 990–c. 1050), discussing the biblical incense ingredient galbanum in his Sefer Ha-Shorashim, noted: "And then there is ḥelbanah (galbanum) which is called in Arabic lūbnī," referring to the resin of the storax tree.

However, some historical researchers speculate that the storax traded by the ancients may have actually been extracted from a different tree, Liquidambar orientalis (sweetgum), which grows wild in southwestern Turkey and northern Syria. This alternative plant source may also represent the historical biblical balm, though other botanical sources conclude that true biblical balm is derived from balsam (opobalsamum).
