= Onycha =

Unknown biblical substance used in incense

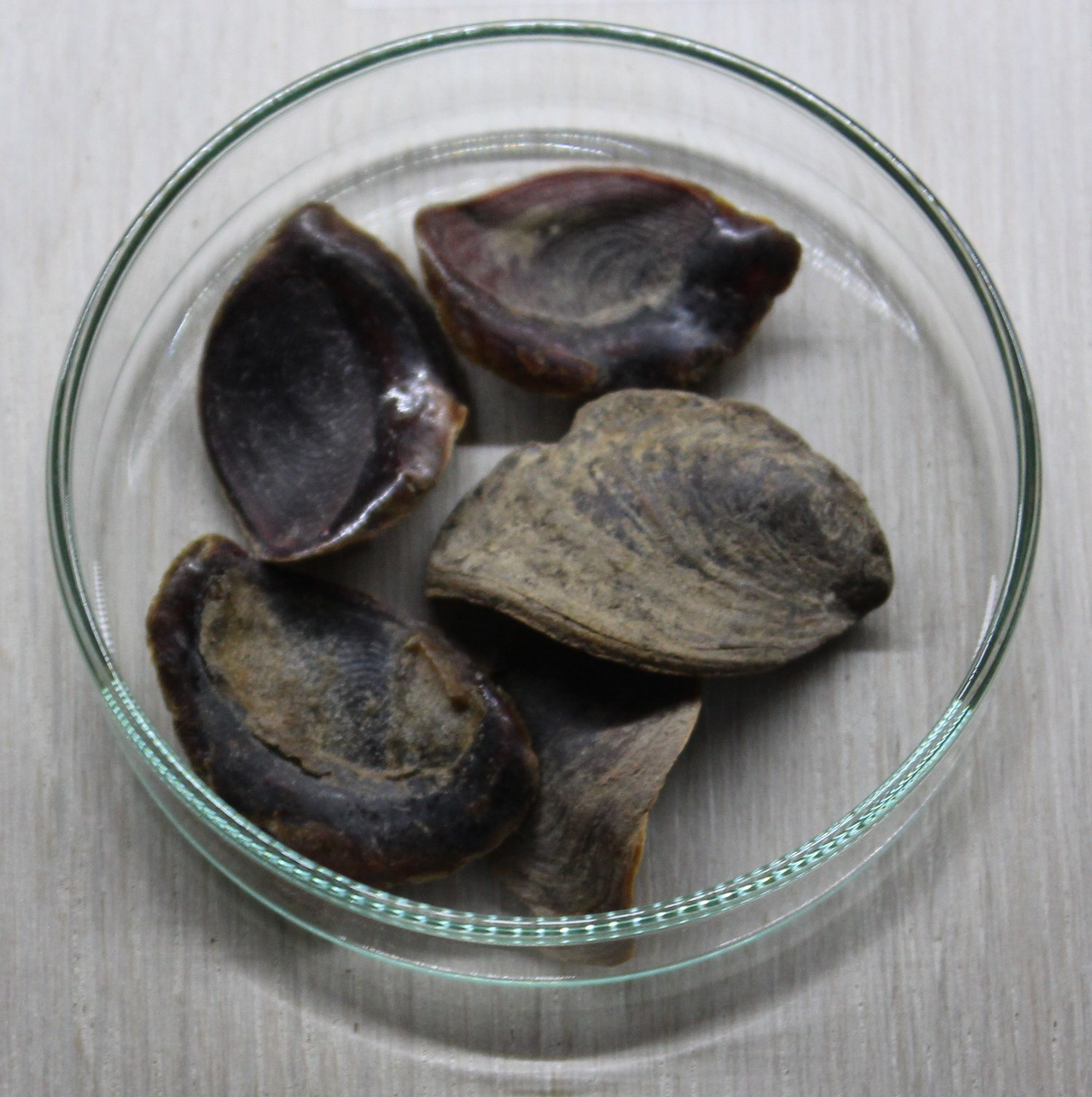
Operculum from sea snails is one possible meaning of onycha

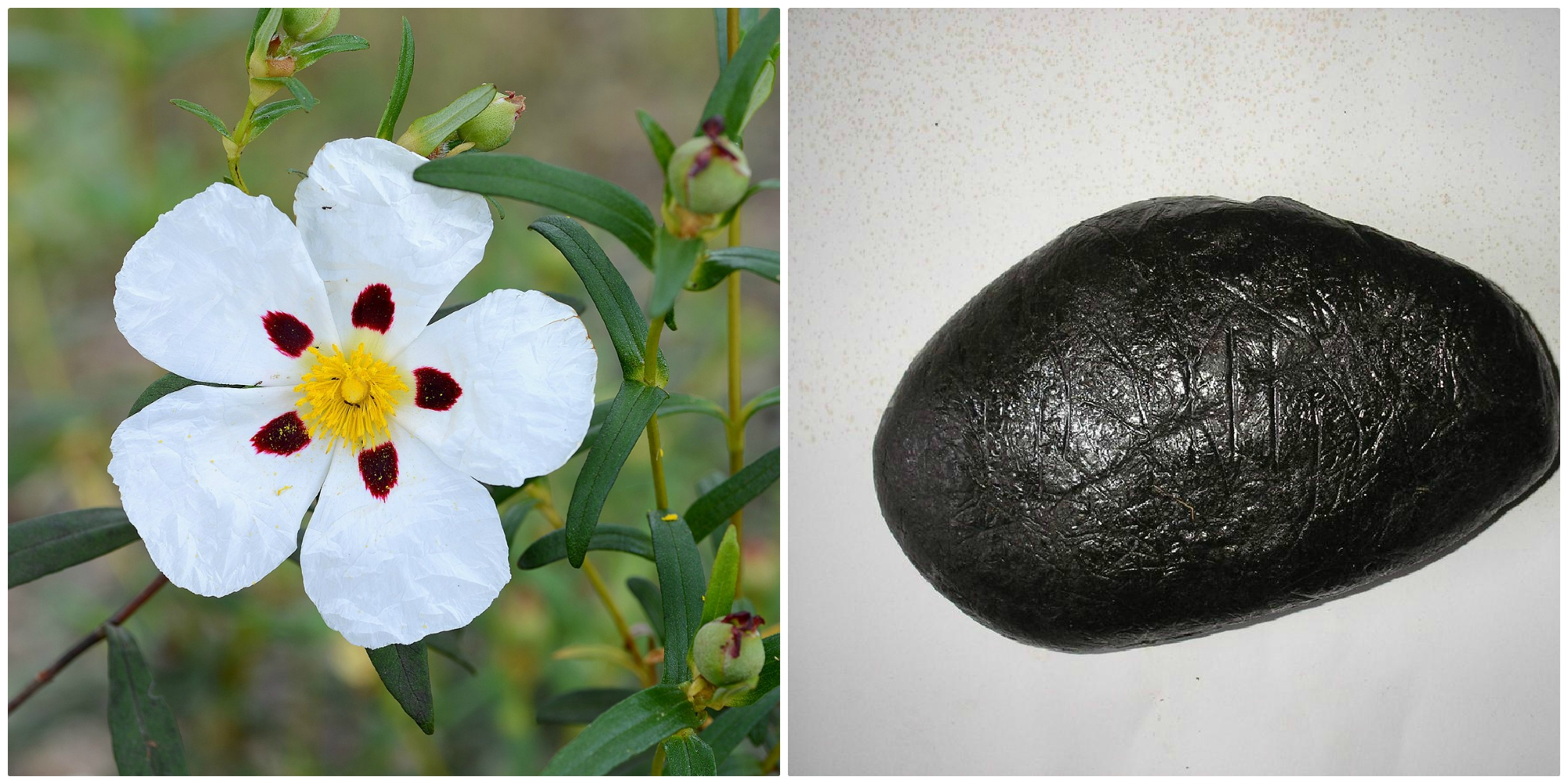
Cistus plant (left) with petals said to resemble human fingernails and labdanum, the resin from the plant (right), said to resemble the black onyx stone. The resin is one contender for onycha.

Onycha (/ˈɒnɪkə/, Ancient Greek: ὄνυξ, romanized: ónux), along with equal parts of stacte, galbanum, and frankincense, was one of the components of the consecrated Ketoret (incense) which appears in the Torah book of Exodus (Ex.30:34-36) and was used in Solomon's Temple in Jerusalem. This formula was to be incorporated as an incense, and was not to be duplicated for non-sacred use. What the onycha of antiquity actually was cannot be determined with certainty. The original Hebrew word used for this component of the ketoret was שחלת, shecheleth, which means "to roar; as a lion (from his characteristic roar)" or “peeling off by concussion of sound." Shecheleth is related to the Syriac shehelta which is translated as “a tear, distillation, or exudation.” In Aramaic, the root SHCHL signifies “retrieve.” When the Torah was translated into Greek (the Septuagint version) the Greek word “onycha” ονυξ, which means "fingernail" or "claw," was substituted for shecheleth.

== Contenders for the identity of onycha ==
=== Operculum ===
Some writers believe that onycha was Unguis odoratus, the fingernail-like operculum, or trap door, of certain sea snails, such as Strombus lentiginosus, Murex anguliferus, and Onyx marinus. It may be the operculum of a snail-like mollusk found in the Red Sea. This operculum is the trap door of a shell, called by the Latins Conchylium. These opercula may be of different sizes, but their overall shape is that of a claw, which is the origin of the name Unguis odoratus. The name Blatta Byzantina is occasioned by its having usually been imported from Constantinople, the ancient Byzantium. In antiquity the operculum was used as an ingredient in incense. The Babylonian Talmud recorded that onycha was rubbed with an alkali solution prepared from the bitter vetch to remove impurities, it was then soaked in the fermented berry juice of the Caper shrub, or a strong white wine, in order to enhance its fragrance.

Although it was forgotten in the West after the fall of the Roman Empire, Murex opercula are still commonly used as an ingredient in traditional North African and Middle Eastern bakhoor (granulated incense), traditional Indian choya nakh attar (produced by dry distillation of Murex opercula), and quite substantively in East Asian incense. From this perspective, some argue that this is the most likely source of onycha.

=== Labdanum ===
There is some doubt as to whether the onycha of the Hebrew Bible was the operculum of a sea snail. H. J. Abrahams says, "The widely held mollusk hypothesis becomes quite perplexing if one considers that the mollusk was counted among the unclean animals in the Bible (Leviticus 11:9 and 12)." Sea creatures such as the mollusk were an “abomination” and even their carcasses were to be considered an “abomination” and anyone simply touching them became unclean. Bahya ben Asher (d. 1340) insisted that only kosher species may be used for the mishkan. The Gemara states that “only items that one may eat may be used for the work of Heaven.” Nachmanides, Torah scholar and famed Jewish theologian, emphasized that the commandment concerning unclean animals pertained also to temple services. James Strong and J. McClintoch write that “it seems improbable that any such substance could have been one of the constituent spices of the most holy perfume; not only because we know of none bearing any powerful and agreeable odor, but specially because all marine creatures that were not finned and scaled fishes were unclean, and as such could not have been touched by the priests or used in the sanctuary.” Bahr states that “the odor of the burned shells is not pleasant.”

Although the word onycha has been interpreted as meaning "nail", it is pointed out that nail or claw is an extended connotation of onyx, derived from the translucent and sometimes veined appearance of the gemstone onyx which antiquity often describes as a black stone. Coincidentally onycha is the Greek word which was chosen to replace the original Hebrew word which was shecheleth. One of the Hebrew words that shecheleth seems to be related to, שחלים, sh'chalim, refers to a large variety of plants. An ancient Ugaritic text lists onycha among types of vegetables, implying that onycha was a vegetable also. The Talmud specifically states that although onycha (shecheleth) is not from a tree, it does grow from the ground and that it is a plant (Kerithoth 6b). There is also some doubt that a mollusk would have been referred to as a "sweet spice" in Exodus 30, since it is the shell of a creature and not an aromatic or pungent vegetable substance. Condor writes “Shecheleth, Exod. xxx. 34; [is] rendered by the Septuagint, onycha, and by the Arabic version, ladana . . . The root of the Hebrew word means to drop or distil, and shecheleth would seem, therefore, to mean some exudation.” James Strong writes "the Syriac etymology of the word, namely, to run in drops, exude, distil, would lead to the idea of a resinous and odoriferous substance of the vegetable kingdom." Another writer says “the context and the etymology seem to require the gum of some aromatic plant, perhaps gum-ladanum. The Hebrew word would seem to mean something that exuded, having odorous qualities.” "Shecheleth" identifies with the Syriac "shehelta" which is translated as “a tear, distillation, or exudation."

According to Winifred Walker's All the Plants of the Bible, shecheleth is a form of rock rose (also known as the Rose of Sharon), Cistus ladaniferus var. Cistus creticus, which produces a resin called labdanum. This sweet spicy ingredient has been used in perfumes and incense for thousands of years and grows profusely in the Middle East, specifically in Israel and Palestine. The rock rose is a bush, not a tree (the Talmud states that onycha comes from a ground plant and not a tree) which bears flowers widely noted for the markings upon its petals resembling human fingernails. Labdanum is the gray-black resin that exudes from the branches of the rock rose bush. Labdanum, after it matures, becomes black and is referred to as black amber or black balsam. Gill states that the word "shecheleth is certainly related to the Hebrew word shechor (black)," denoting the color of the shecheleth used in the ketoret formula. Onycha is a play on the word onyx which was a gem. The onyx most esteemed by the ancients was the black gem. The Hebrew word for onyx was shoham and “Braun traces shoham to the Arabic sachma,'blackness:' 'Of such a color,' says he, 'are the Arabian [onyxes], which have a black ground-color.' This agrees essentially with Charles William King's remarks 'The Arabian species,' he says, 'were formed of black or blue strata.” The rock rose also has an inseparable identification with rocks because its existence depends upon its roots anchoring among them in areas where no other foliage is able to grow. After labdanum became hard it may have been put through another process causing it to emulate even more of the "beautiful" attributes of the onyx or to refine it, "that it be pleasant." When used in sacred rites resins were often steeped in wine to, among other things, increase their fragrance.

A reference to onycha as an annual plant may be confusion with its annual yield. Rock rose usually produces labdanum annually, during the summer, to protect itself from the heat. A reference to onycha as a root may be due to the practice of boiling the twigs and roots for labdanum extraction or the use of cistus roots as a medicine. The root of the Cistus plant is a Jordanian traditional medicine. The root is still used today by the Arabs for bronchitis and also as a pectorial, demulcent, tonic, and anti-diabetic. Then again the possibility exists that while the onycha of Exodus 30 was labdanum, the identity of onycha may have been lost some time during or after the Babylonian captivity, with the operculum becoming identified as onycha during the time of the second Temple. However, as the original onycha of the book of Exodus, Abrahams says that, more than any other substance, "labdanum fills the bill most convincingly."

The flowers of the rockrose bush are described as having petals with scarlet and black fingernail-shaped markings, thus its historically acclaimed connection with the Greek ονυξ (= onyx). Lynne writes, “Onycha . . . is a rockrose which produces a gum that is known as labdanum. The blossoms are about three inches across, white with at the base of each petal a blotch of brilliant scarlet-rose which deepens into black. In Greek onycha means 'fingernail.' The blotch of color in each petal looks exactly like a brightly painted red fingernail.” Others proclaim that the very petals of this plant are shaped like finger nails. Again, onycha in Greek means “fingernail” or “claw.” Claws were used in ancient Egypt to collect labdanum. Pharaohs were pictured with this claw (a nekhakha) resting on their breasts. Claws, or rakes, were used to collect the labdanum from the cistus bushes and smaller claws, or combs, were used to collect labdanum from the beards of the wild goats. Removing and peeling the very sticky, adhesive labdanum from these very temperamental animals caused them to cry out, to “peel out by the concussion of sound,” or to “roar” out in protest. As mentioned above the original Hebrew word for onycha was שחלת, shecheleth, which comes from a root meaning "to roar" or “peeling off by concussion of sound." In Aramaic, the root SHCHL signifies “retrieve.” For thousands of years labdanum has been retrieved from the beards of goats and the wool of lambs by this method. The resin was peeled off of the goats’ beards, lambs’ wool, and from the lambadistrion (labdanum-gatherer). The Arabic word for peel is sahala. The Pharaoh's beard was made up of goats’ hair which was held together and scented by labdanum. When the royal kingly Pharaoh spoke it was as the lion's “roar,” the voice of god to the people. The Pharaoh was called the "incarnation of Atum." Massy writes that, "The lion was a zootype of Atum . . . He is called the lion-faced in the Ritual . . . He is addressed as a lion god, the god in lion form." Pharaohs were often depicted as part human and part lion wearing the false beard saturated with labdanum. This beard was inspired by the lion's mane and was part of the various sphinx depicting the Pharaohs. A sphinx of Pharaoh Hatsheput displays a lion's mane and the pharaoh's manufactured beard. Strong defines the root word of shecheleth as "to roar; a lion (from his characteristic roar)." Labdanum was used not only as a perfume and adhesive for the Pharaohs beard but was also used by the Egyptian art of the apothecary in an incense known as kyphi which was rolled into small balls and burned upon coals of fire. However labdanum could also be an ingredient of a powdered incense. When aged it becomes more fragrant but it also becomes very brittle and hard. The fresh resin is a soft, sticky, and tar-like substance that is sweet, flowery, musky, and reminiscent of honey or ambergris with a hint of sweet leather. Mendes writes that at one point Rabban Simeon, the son of Gamliel, seems to indicate that one of the reasons wine was used was to make onycha become hard, which would seem to suggest that onycha was not a preexistingly hard mollusk shell, but that onycha was a soft resinous material such as is labdanum. Herodotus affirms that it was much used by the Arabians in perfumes. According to Pliny the Elder (23 - 79 CE), who mentions its fragrant smell, it was the extract of an herb called " ladan." Labdanum was known as "Arabic ladan."

According to the book of Exodus the Israelites were familiar with the ancient art of the apothecary (or perfumery) of the Egyptians from whom they had just been liberated. Lucas lists labdanum (along with frankincense, myrrh, galbanum, and storax) among the only materials most certain to have been used in ancient Egypt and that labdanum "was abundant in the countries bordering the Mediterranean with which Egypt had intercourse.” He writes that in the Bible “ it is stated that certain merchants carried ladanum into Egypt from Gilead (Genesis, xxxvii:25, Revised Version) and that Jacob sent ladanum to Egypt as a present to his son Joseph (Genesis, xliii:II Revised Version).” Percy Newberry reports that the ancient Egyptians were acquainted with labdanum as early as the 1st century. Pliny states that the Ptolemies introduced labdanum into 'the parts beyond Egypt.” It was known to the Greeks as early as the times of Herodotus (484-425 BCE) and Theophrastus (370 - 285 BCE). It was one of the ingredients in a remedy in the ancient Egyptian Materia Medica, and in an ancient Egyptian papyrus dated 1500 BCE it is used along with hippopotamus fat, as a cure for dandruff. Labdanum was “often made into incense cakes for temple offerings as well as used as a fixative in perfumes. Lucas records an “instance of labdanum having been found in connection with ancient Egypt [which] is a specimen of Coptic incense of the seventh century from Faras near Wadi Halfa.

Martin Luther, in co-operation with Bible expert and Greek scholar Philipp Melanchton, rejected the operculum theory in favor of onycha being a plant product. A commentary footnote in one of the older copies of the Authorized Version seems to agree saying, “The only hint about the onycha that we can find is in the Arabic version, where we meet with ladana, suggesting . . . gum-ladanum.” The Illustrated Dictionary of the Bible plainly defines onycha as the “gum resin obtained from . . . the rockrose, also known as labdanum.

Bochartus, a scholar of profound erudition possessing a thorough knowledge of the principal Oriental languages, including Hebrew, Syriac, and Arabic, argued that onycha was labdanum. It is claimed “Bochartus proves, by many arguments, [onycha ] to be ladanum”

Abrahams writes that "the Hebrew name shecheleth was translated as ladana, giving rise to labdanum." The renowned Jewish scholar and writer Saadya (Saʻadiah ben Yosef Gaon, 882–942), born in Upper Egypt (Fayum) and educated in Fustat (Old Cairo), translated the Bible into Arabic. Saadya, who was a theologian as well as the head Rabbi at the Sura Academy, was equally versed in Hebrew, in Greek, and in Arabic, and knew the people and customs of the whole Arabic region intimately. Saadya's translation for Shecheleth was the Arabic "Ladana," and ladana is our ladanum or labdanum. H.J. Abrahams states that "I am sure that Shecheleth (onycha) is a plant product . . . After diligent reflection on all these diverse options, there is little doubt in my mind that onycha of Exodus 30:34 is labdanum. Saadya's labdanum is not only ideally suited for use in incense, but it is also a product of the Jewish homeland."

== Lesser recognized contenders ==
There are several lesser recognized contenders for the title "Onycha" which should also be mentioned here:

=== Benzoin ===
The internationally renowned Bible scholar Bochart stated, at one point in his research, that onycha was actually benzoin, a gum-resin from the Styrax species. H.J. Abrahams states that the use of benzoin in the Biblical incense is not inconceivable since Syro-Arabian tribes maintained extensive trade routes prior to Hellenism. Styrax Benzoin was available via import to the biblical lands during the Old Testament era. Herodotus of Halicarnassus in the 5th century BCE indicates that different kinds of styrax resins were traded. Styrax benzoin was used by the ancient Egyptians in the art of perfumery and incense. The apothecary of Shemot (book of Exodus) would have been familiar with its aromatic uses. S. benzoin has a history steeped in antiquity and was once employed as an incense in Egypt. All the compounds identified in benzoin resin were detected in an archaeological organic residue from an Egyptian ceramic censer, thus proving that this resin was used as one of the components of the mixture of organic materials burned as incense in ancient Egypt. An ancient Egyptian perfume formula (1200 BCE) contained benzoin as one of its chief ingredients. The name "benzoin" is probably derived from Arabic lubān jāwī (لبان جاوي, "Javan frankincense"); compare the mid-eastern terms "gum benjamin" and "benjoin". The word 'Storax' is an alteration of the Late Latin styrax. In the Orphic Hymns it is στόρακας or στόρακα. As pointed out earlier, the original word shecheleth was replaced with onycha by the Septuagint translation. Onycha in turn is derived from the onyx stone meaning "fingernail". Conder writes that "the root of the Hebrew word [shecheleth] means to drop or distil, and shecheleth would seem, therefore, to mean some exudation.” Another writer says that the Hebrew shecheleth identifies with the Syriac shehelta which is translated as “a tear or distillation” and that “the context and the etymology seem to require the gum of some aromatic plant . . . The Hebrew word would seem to mean something that exuded, having odorous qualities.” The book of Ecclesiasticus lists storax as one of the ingredients when alluding to the sacred incense of the biblical tabernacle. The Hindustanis use Benzoin to burn in their temples—a circumstance strongly in favor of the hypothesis that benzoin is part of the incense formula of Exodus. The infrequent mention of benzoin by name in antiquity is quite suspicious considering its importance in ancient recipes. It stands to reason it must have been known by another name not currently used today. References to it by name are conspicuously missing also from the Old Testament. Callcott writes “It has been suggested that Gum Benzoin, which is not mentioned by any other name in scripture, must be onycha. Its fracture has exactly the lustre required by the name. . . The gum is a secretion of the bark, and is of great efficacy in healing wounds. . . Such are the pretensions of the Benzoin to be looked upon as the true Onycha, which, from the text, as I have already said, must have been some fragrant vegetable gum in itself, of foreign production, and ranking with stacte, and myrrh, and galbanum . . . all which conditions are fulfilled by the Gum Benzoin.” Dioscorides and Galen describe two kinds of bdellium, the second of which is Benzoin, according to Hardouin and Sprengel. Pererra describes benzoin tears as "flattened pieces, some of which are angular, and the larger of them . . . an inch in length". He says that "externally, these pieces are shiny." This description most certainly fits well with the interpretation of "onycha" which means "fingernail." He continues to say many of the pieces "are of an amber or reddish-yellow colour" and continues to describe parts of it as "translucent or milky, and frequently striped." This is a good description of the appearance of various onyx stones, from which the name onycha is derived. He says that many tears of Styrax benzoin "are translucent, or, in a few cases, almost transparent." One type of benzoin has "numerous, white, small pieces . . . intermingled, which thereby give the broken surface a speckled appearance" which he calls "marbly." As mentioned above, although the word onycha has been interpreted as meaning "nail" it is pointed out that nail or claw is actually an extended connotation of onyx, derived from the translucent and sometimes veined appearance of the gemstone onyx. Onyx comes in a variety of colors the most prominent being either the black and veined striped gem or the pinkish translucent striped gem. One related Styrax is black and the benzoin discussed thus far seems to be of the pinkish, translucent sort. Steeping Styrax benzoin tears in wine can enhance its fragrance as well as its translucent qualities and "shiny" appearance, thus making it appear even more like the onyx gem. Rambam stated that soaking onycha in wine made it beautiful. Benzoin tears look very different from other resins and appear to be small stones rather than the vegetable product that it is.

Rashi writes that onycha was a root from the ground. Benzoin almonds do not resemble the resins they actually are but appear as a rough stony almonds. Not being native to Palestine they could easily have been mistaken as portions of a root since they do not seem to adequately resemble any other portion of a plant body. However it seems that the root of benzoin was also used. The ancient Greeks and Romans used benzoin root in a seasoning sauce for a meat boiled in sweet herbs. A Roman supper sometimes included shellfish prepared with pepper, cinnamon, and benzoin root. Benzoin root was also used in a recipe for seasoning goose liver. Benzoin root is still used today in incense recipes. Also the resin proper is procured near the root of the tree. Resin procured from the tree during the first three years is referred to as head benzoin. That which is obtained during the next 7 or 8 years is known as the belly benzoin. The third type is called foot benzoin, and is obtained by splitting the tree and scraping the wood of the trunk and roots. This latter source contains impurities. Rambam says that onycha was rubbed with bitter vetch to remove impurities. The Talmud also appears to indicate that onycha came from an annual plant. Benzoin gum is harvested annually, and not being native to Palestine it is possible confusion slipped in identifying its annual yield with its life span. Different Styrax trees are often misidentified or referred to as a "bush." Onycha is said to have been soaked in wine to enhance its fragrance which was often done with resins used for incense.

The Hindustanis refer to benzoin as “lobanee” or “luban”. The Arabs refer to it as “luban” or “luban jawi”.

The book of Eccesiasticus (Sirach) 24:15 alludes to the sacred incense speaking of “a pleasant odour like the best myrrh, as galbanum, and onyx, and sweet storax, and as the fume of frankincense in the tabernacle.” The storax of antiquity was styrax. The writer refers to "onyx" as opposed to "onycha" while referencing styrax as part of the formula. Stacte may have been light myrrh treated with benzoin. Onycha may have been labdanum. Since myrrh was often mixed with labdanum, throughout many centuries benzoin and labdanum may have inadvertently switched places in the formula. The possibility exists that the onycha of Exodus 30 was labdanum while the onycha of the second Temple was benzoin, with both ingredients still remaining in both formulas.

Winifred Walker writes that the onycha referred to in Exodus 30 is labdanum but later in the same book states that there was also another onycha, which he also equates as a component of the holy incense, which may have been derived from benzoin.

Labdanum and benzoin mixed

Labdanum and benzoin were often mixed together. The reproduced scent of ambergris is predominantly a mix of labdanum and benzoin. Ambergris was used by the ancient Egyptians as an incense. For centuries, benzoin has been mixed with labdanum, particularly in the Middle East, as an incense to scent homes, places of worship, and as an air purifier. This blend was used by the ancient Egyptians as an incense. Based on some of the latest research from the Edfu temple and a recent study of ceramic dishes used in the preparation of kyphi, it appears that labdanum mixed with benzoin was an important part of the kyphi recipe. It was also part of the formula written about by Nostradamus who said it made “the most supreme perfume, and the longest-lasting that can be made anywhere in the world” and that it acted as an air purifier against disease. It is possible that onycha was this mix of labdanum and Styrax benzoin. Styrax (referred to as storax in antiquity) is mentioned alongside of onycha in Eccesiasticus 24:15 when alluding to the sacred incense. Either onycha and styrax were originally mixed together or styrax was treated with labdanum or by the time of the first temple period a fifth ingredient was added to the ketoret. Stacte may have been light myrrh treated with benzoin.

Again, the possibility exists that the onycha of Exodus 30 was labdanum, while the onycha of the second Temple was benzoin or even the operculum.

=== Bdellium ===
Commiphora wightii, syn. C. mukul: Bdellium has been seriously considered as the ancient onycha. The tree, which grows in Arabia, produces a gum that was used in antiquity as an incense. It was one of the substances used in incense in ancient Egypt. As an incense it produces a sweet, spicy smell that some consider similar, although less bitter than, myrrh, combined with the scent of mushroom. The gum was often used as an adulterant of myrrh in the spice trade. The gum rolled into a small ball is known as hadrabolon. It is dry and shining having numerous white spots, like finger-nails in shape. Dioscorides said that bdellium was "the tear of an Arabian tree." He describes bdellium as resembling a fingernail (which is the Greek meaning of onycha). Pliny says that bdellium " is shining and dry, and covered with numerous white spots resembling the fingernails." This appears to be the same bdellium referred to by Damocritus, a medical writer, who was quoted by Saracenus in his Scholia in Dioscoridis, and the same bdellium referred to by Galen, as quoted by Salmasius in his Plinianae Exercitationes. Salmasius states that bdellium is the Arab Molochil (Mukul).

When used in sacred rites, bdellium was steeped in wine to increase its fragrance (Rambam says that shecheleth, or onycha, was steeped in wine to enhance its fragrance). The gum exudes from the cracks in the bark of the trunk near the root (Rashi refers to onycha, or shecheleth, as a kind of root). Bdellium is referred to in the early history of the Bible. Bdellium, like onyx, is the name both of an odoriferous gum and also of a gem or precious stone. "And the gold of that land is good: there is bdellium and the onyx stone." (Gen 2:12)

=== Gum tragacanth ===
After gum tragacanth is harvested, it takes on the appearance of grotesque "fingernails." It had been used for thousands of years as an ingredient in incense, and has been seriously considered as a likely candidate for onycha.

=== Cloves ===
Cloves or "zipporen" in Hebrew, have been considered as a possibility. In contemporary Hebrew the word means "nails".

=== Amber ===
It was the opinion of K.G. Jacob that shecheleth was amber.

=== Cuttlefish bone ===
Cuttlefish bone looks like large fingernails and can also be used in incense.

=== Spikenard ===
Spikenard is a well known aromatic herb that has been suggested in this context.

== See also ==
- Ambergris
- Ketoret
- Labdanum
- Rockrose
- Bdellium
- Operculum
- Tragacanth
