= Riha (Mandaeism) =

Incense used in Mandaean religious rituals

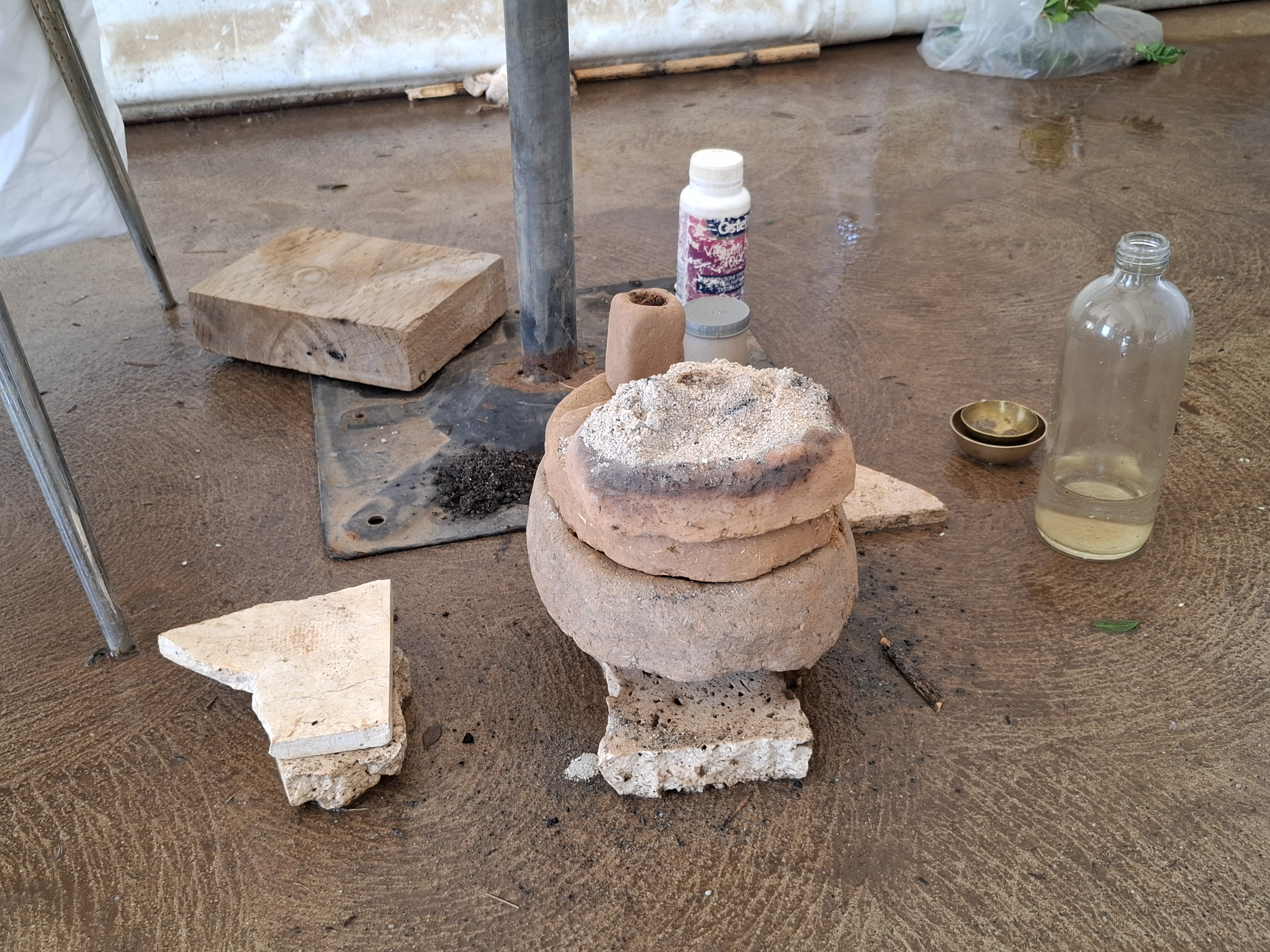
Incense holder (qauqa) placed on a clay fire-saucer (brihi) at Wallacia Mandi during Parwanaya 2025

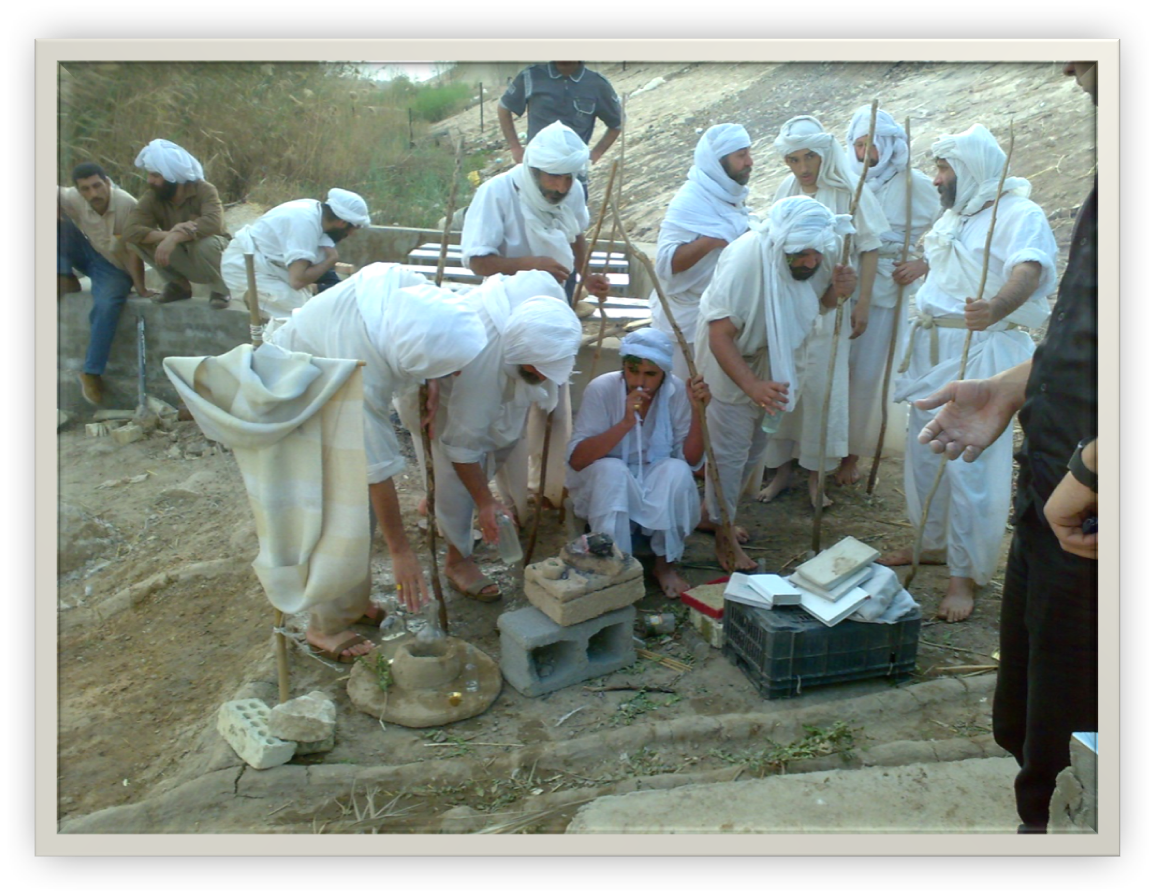
Mandaeans in Iraq preparing incense in preparation for a tarmida initiation ceremony

In Mandaeism, riha (Classical Mandaic: ࡓࡉࡄࡀ, Modern Mandaic pronunciation: [ˈriːha]) is incense used for religious rituals. It is offered by Mandaean priests on a ritual clay tray called kinta in order to establish laufa (communion) between humans in Tibil (Earth) and uthras (celestial beings) in the World of Light during rituals such as the masbuta (baptism) and masiqta (death mass), as well as during priest initiation ceremonies. Various prayers in the Qulasta are recited when incense is offered. Incense must be offered during specific stages of the typically lengthy and complex rituals.

== In the Qulasta ==
Several prayers in the Qulasta are recited when offering incense, including prayers 8 ("riha ḏ-basim") and 34 ("hal hiia qadmaiia").

== Associated ritual objects ==
The brihi is a ritual clay fire saucer that is narrow end faces north. It is used for the riha and pihta.

The qauqa is a small terra-cotta cube with a depression on top to hold the riha.

== See also ==
- Incense offering in Judaism
- Incense offering in rabbinic literature
- Kyphi in Ancient Egypt
- Religious use of incense
