= Religious use of incense =

Evangelical-Lutheran acolytes of the Church of Sweden incense the congregation during the celebration of High Mass at the Church of the Holy Trinity in Uppsala, Sweden

Religious use of incense has its origins in antiquity. The burned incense may be intended as a symbolic or sacrificial offering to God, various deities or spirits, or to serve as an aid in prayer.

== History ==
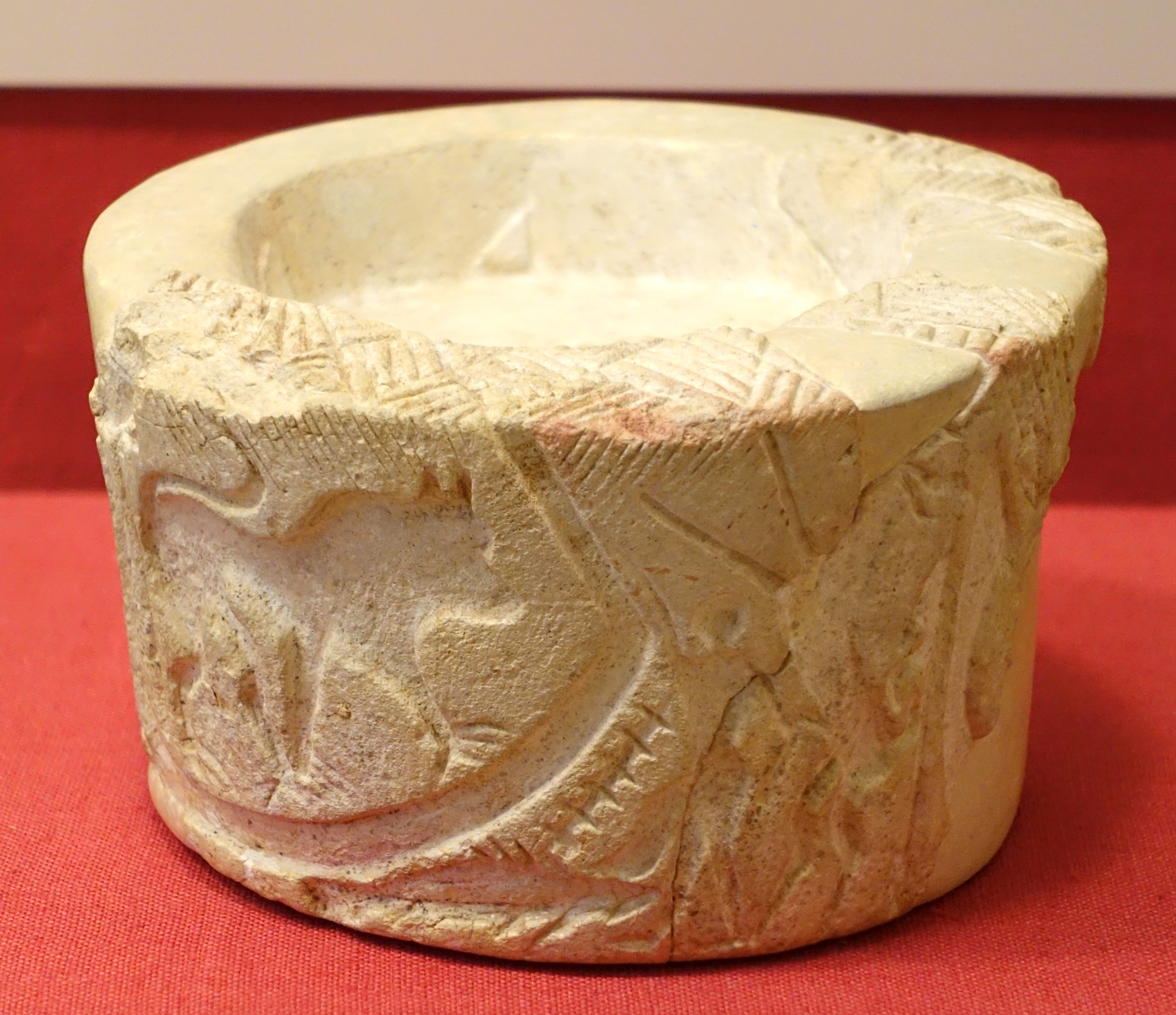
Qustul Incense Burner, Nubia, Cemetery L, tomb 24, A-Group, 3300-3000 BC, limestone - Oriental Institute Museum, University of Chicago

The earliest documented use of incense comes from the ancient Sudanese. Archaeological discoveries at Qustul, a site in Lower Nubia in northern Sudan have revealed one of the earliest known incense burners, dating to the A-Group culture around 3300-3000 BCE. The Qustul incense burner, made of ceramic and adorned with iconography such as processions and what some scholars interpret as royal emblems, suggests that incense and its ritual use were already well-developed in Nubian religious and political life. It was used in the Indus Valley Civilisation by the c. 2600–1900 BC, and Egyptians during the Fifth Dynasty, 2345-2494 BC.

== Nile Valley Civilizations ==
=== Ancient Sudan ===
In ancient Nubia, incense use can be traced back to the A-Group culture and the earliest known Nubian kingdom, Ta-Seti, centered in Lower Nubia. Archaeological excavations at Qustul Cemetery L uncovered ceramic incense burners dating to c. 3000 BCE, one of which bears iconography associated with kingship such as white crown of Upper Egypt and sacred boat motifs. These finds led scholars to propose that ritual use of incense and royal ceremonial practices may have originated or co-developed in Sudan prior to early dynastic Egypt.

In later Kushite periods (especially Napatan and Meroitic, 800 BCE–350 CE), incense continued to feature prominently in both temple rituals and burial practices. Inscriptions at temples in Gebel Barkal, Naqa, and Musawwarat es-Sufra reference offerings of aromatic substances to Amun, Apedemak, and other deities, indicating the continuation of complex incense rituals well into the first millennium BCE.

==== Ancient Egypt ====
In pharaonic Egypt, incense was integral to temple ceremonies, funerary rites, and divine offerings. From the Old Kingdom (c. 2600 BCE), scenes in tombs and temples depict priests burning incense before statues of gods and kings. Resins like kyphi, myrrh, and frankincense were believed to carry prayers to the heavens, cleanse ritual spaces, and embody the breath of the gods.

Texts such as the Pyramid Texts and Book of the Dead refer to incense as a sacred offering linked to deities like Ra, Osiris, and Horus. Its fragrance was seen as pleasing to the gods and essential for maintaining ma’at (cosmic order) in ritual space. By the New Kingdom (1550–1070 BCE), incense was a state-managed commodity, imported through expeditions to Punt, and burned daily in temples across Egypt. Incense also played a role in household altars and personal piety among non-elite Egyptians.

== Buddhism, Taoism and Shinto in Asia ==
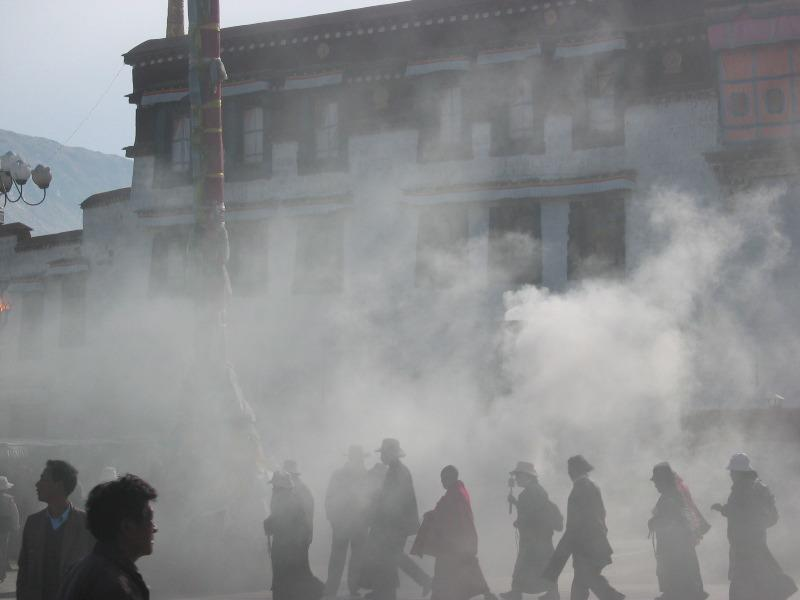
Incense smoke wafts from huge burners in Lhasa, Tibet.

Incense use in religious ritual was either further or simultaneously developed in China, and eventually transmitted to Korea, Japan, Myanmar, Vietnam, Laos, Cambodia, Thailand, Indonesia, Malaysia, Singapore, and the Philippines. Incense holds an invaluable role in East Asian Buddhist ceremonies and rites as well as in those of Chinese Taoist and Japanese Shinto shrines for the deity Inari Okami, or the Seven Lucky Gods. It is reputed to be a method of purifying the surroundings, bringing forth an assembly of buddhas, bodhisattvas, gods, demons, and the like.

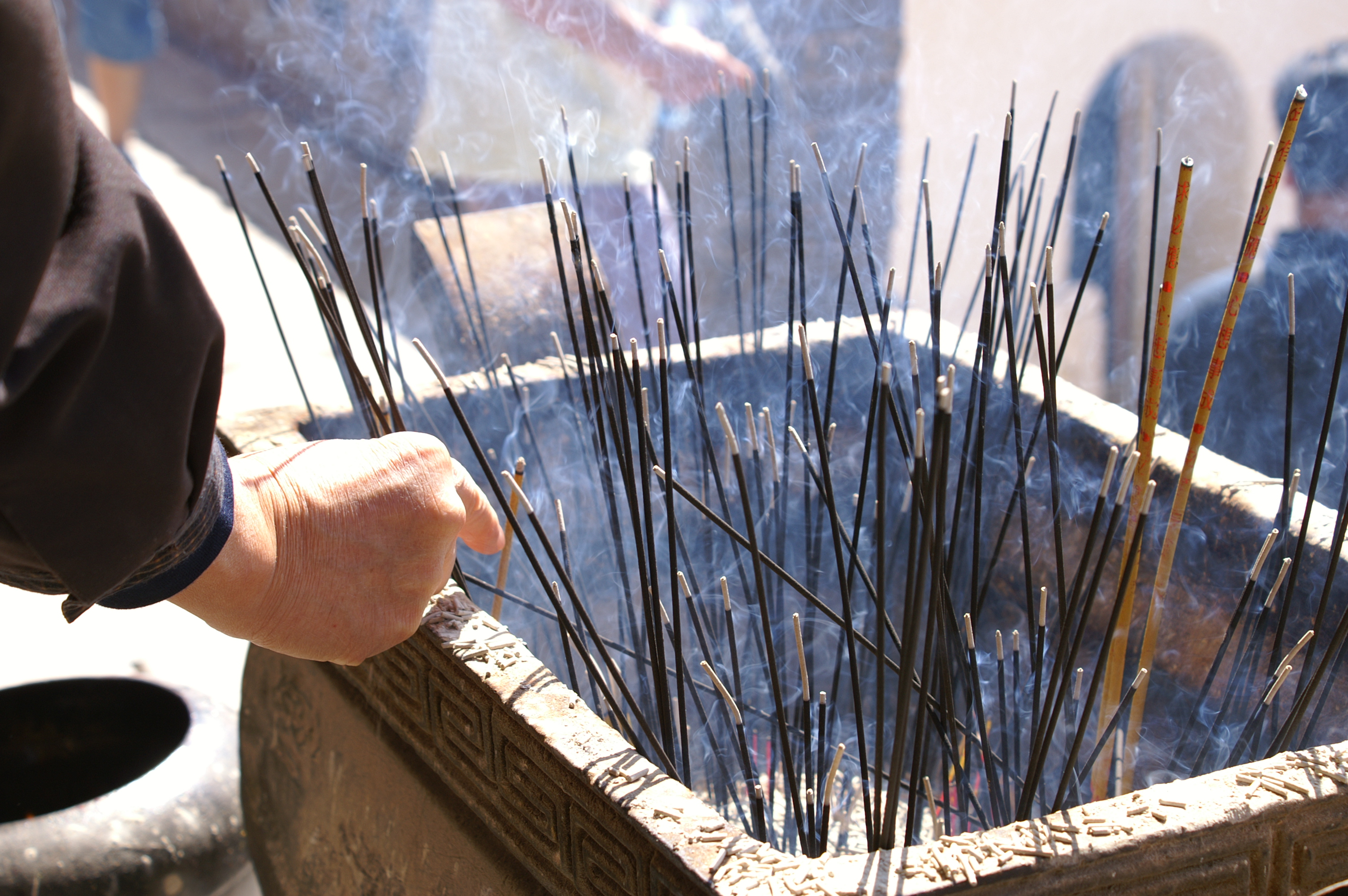
Incense sticks being burnt at a Chinese Buddhist place of worship.

In Chinese Taoist and Buddhist temples, the inner spaces are scented with thick coiled incense, which are either hung from the ceiling or on special stands. Worshipers at the temples light and burn sticks of incense in small or large bundles, which they wave or raise above the head while bowing to the statues or plaques of a deity or an ancestor. Individual sticks of incense are then vertically placed into individual censers located in front of the statues or plaques either singularly or in threes, depending on the status of the deity or the feelings of the individual.

In Japanese Shinto shrines to Inari Okami or the Seven Lucky Gods and Buddhist temples, the sticks of incense are placed horizontally into censers on top of the ash since the sticks used normally lack a supporting core that does not burn.

The formula and scent of the incense sticks used in various temples throughout Asia vary widely.

== Christianity ==
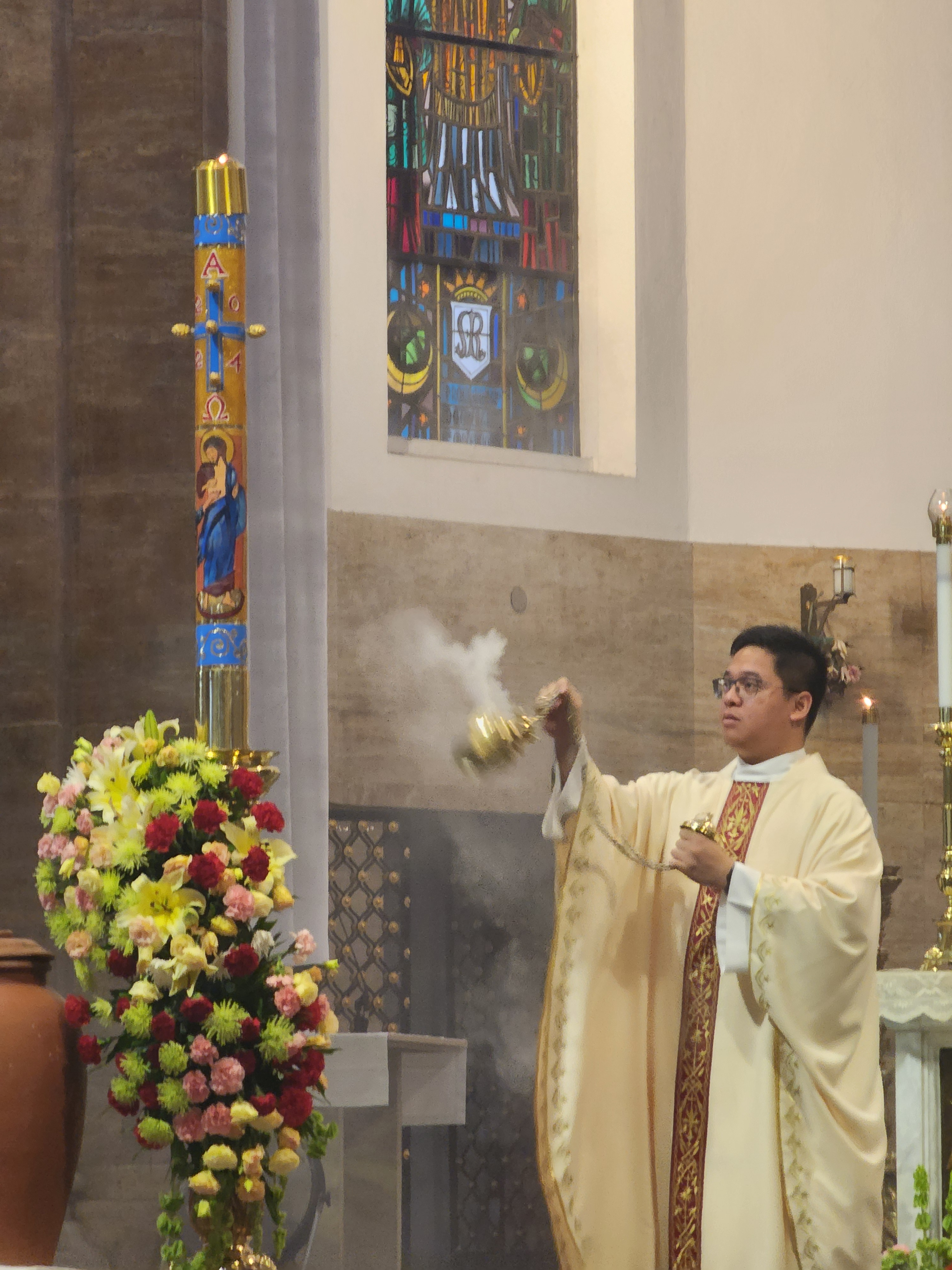
A Catholic priest incenses the Paschal candle at the Manila Cathedral. The Catholic tradition employs incense in worship, contained within a thurible.

The use of incense in Christianity is inspired by passages in the Bible; its use in prayer and worship carries with it a Christian symbolism. Incense has been employed in worship by Christians since antiquity, particularly in the Roman Catholic Church/Eastern Catholic Church, Orthodox Christian churches, Lutheran Churches, Old Catholic/Liberal Catholic Churches and some Anglican Churches. Incense is being increasingly used among some other Christian groups as well; for example, in Methodism, the Book of Worship of The United Methodist Church calls for incense in the Evening Praise and Prayer service. The practice is rooted in the earlier traditions of Judaism in the time of the Second Jewish Temple. The smoke of burning incense is interpreted by both the Western Catholic and Eastern Christian churches as a symbol of the prayer of the faithful rising to heaven. This symbolism is seen in Psalm 141 (140), verse 2: "Let my prayer be directed as incense in thy sight: the lifting up of my hands, as evening sacrifice." Incense is often used as part of a purification ritual.

In the Revelation of John, incense symbolises the prayers of the saints in heaven – the "golden bowl full of incense" are "the prayers of the saints" (Revelation 5:8, cf. Revelation 8:3) which infuse upwards towards the altar of God.

A thurible, a type of censer, is used to contain incense as it is burned. A server called a thurifer, sometimes assisted by a "boat bearer" who carries the receptacle for the incense, approaches the person conducting the service with the thurible charged with burning bricks of red-hot charcoal. Incense, in the form of pebbly grains or powder, is taken from what is called a "boat", and usually blessed with a prayer and spooned onto the coals. The thurible is then closed, and taken by the chain and swung by the priest, deacon or server or acolyte towards what or who is being censed: the bread and wine offered for the Eucharist, the consecrated Eucharist itself, the Gospel during its proclamation (reading), the crucifix, the icons (in Eastern churches), the clergy, the congregation, the Paschal candle or the body of a deceased person during a funeral.

Incense may be used in Christian worship at the celebration of the Eucharist, at solemn celebrations of the Divine Office, in particular at Solemn Vespers, at Solemn Evensong, at funerals, benediction and exposition of the Eucharist, the consecration of a church or altar and at other services. In the Eastern Orthodox Church, Lutheran churches of Evangelical Catholic churchmanship, Anglican churches of Anglo-Catholic churchmanship, and Old Catholic/Liberal Catholic churches, incense is used at virtually every service.

Aside from being burnt, grains of blessed incense are placed in the Paschal candle, and were formerly placed in the sepulchre of consecrated altars, though this is no longer obligatory or even mentioned in the liturgical books.

Many formulations of incense are currently used, often with frankincense, benzoin, myrrh, styrax, copal or other aromatics.

Incense used during an Evangelical-Lutheran Mass at Vadstena Abbey Church in Sweden

Incense used during the offering of the Holy Mass at Vadstena Abbey Church (Evangelical-Lutheran) in Sweden

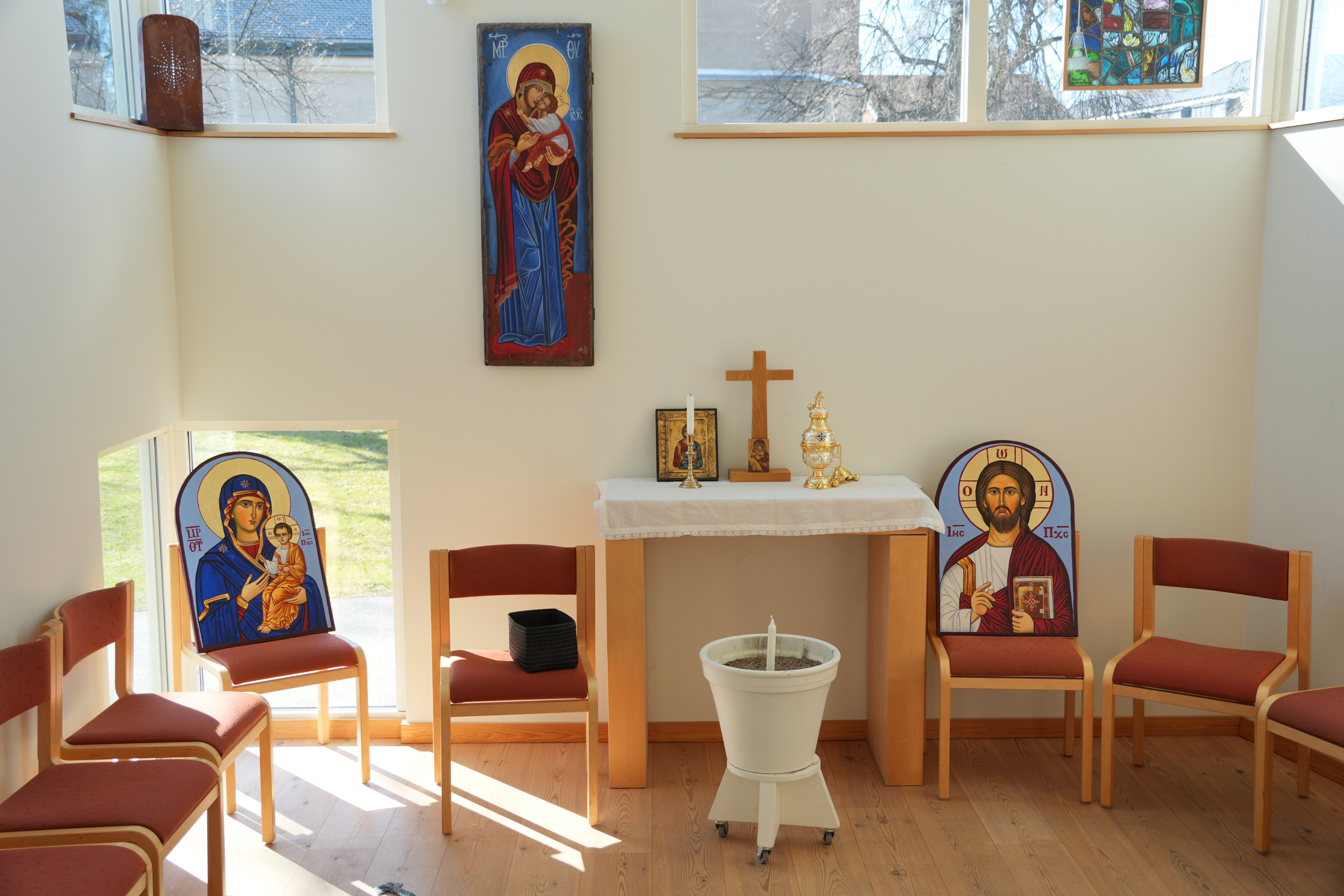
A thurible sits atop the altar of the Lady Chapel of Norrtälje Evangelical-Lutheran Church in Sweden

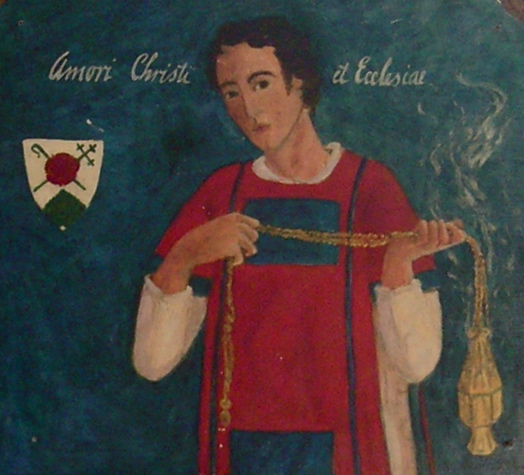
Sacristy Painting showing a thurifer holding a thurible with burning incense, Episcopal Church of the Good Shepherd, Pennsylvania

Incense during Vespers at Vadstena Abbey Church (Evangelical-Lutheran) in Sweden

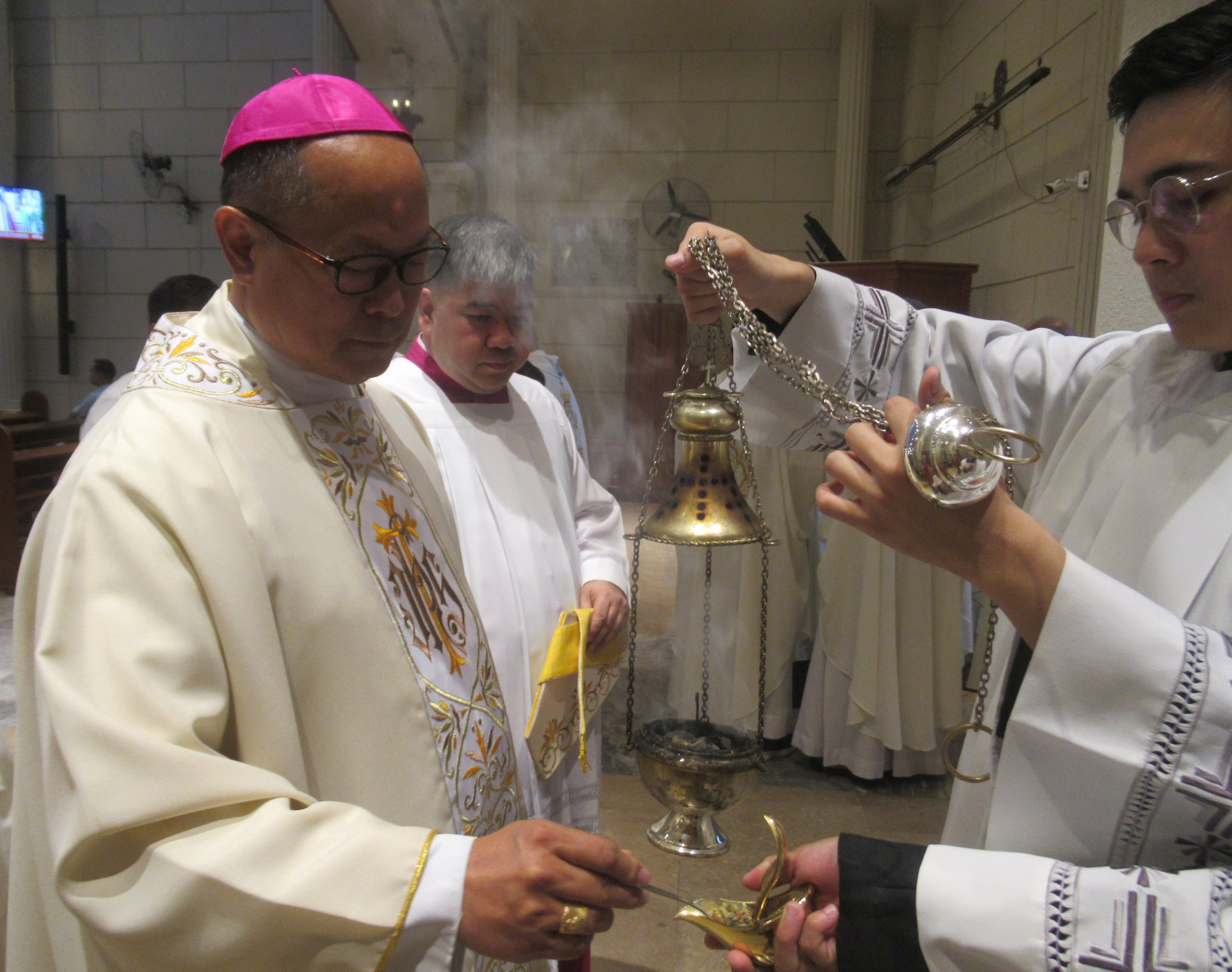
Bishop Mangalinao preparing incense for Mass

== Hinduism ==
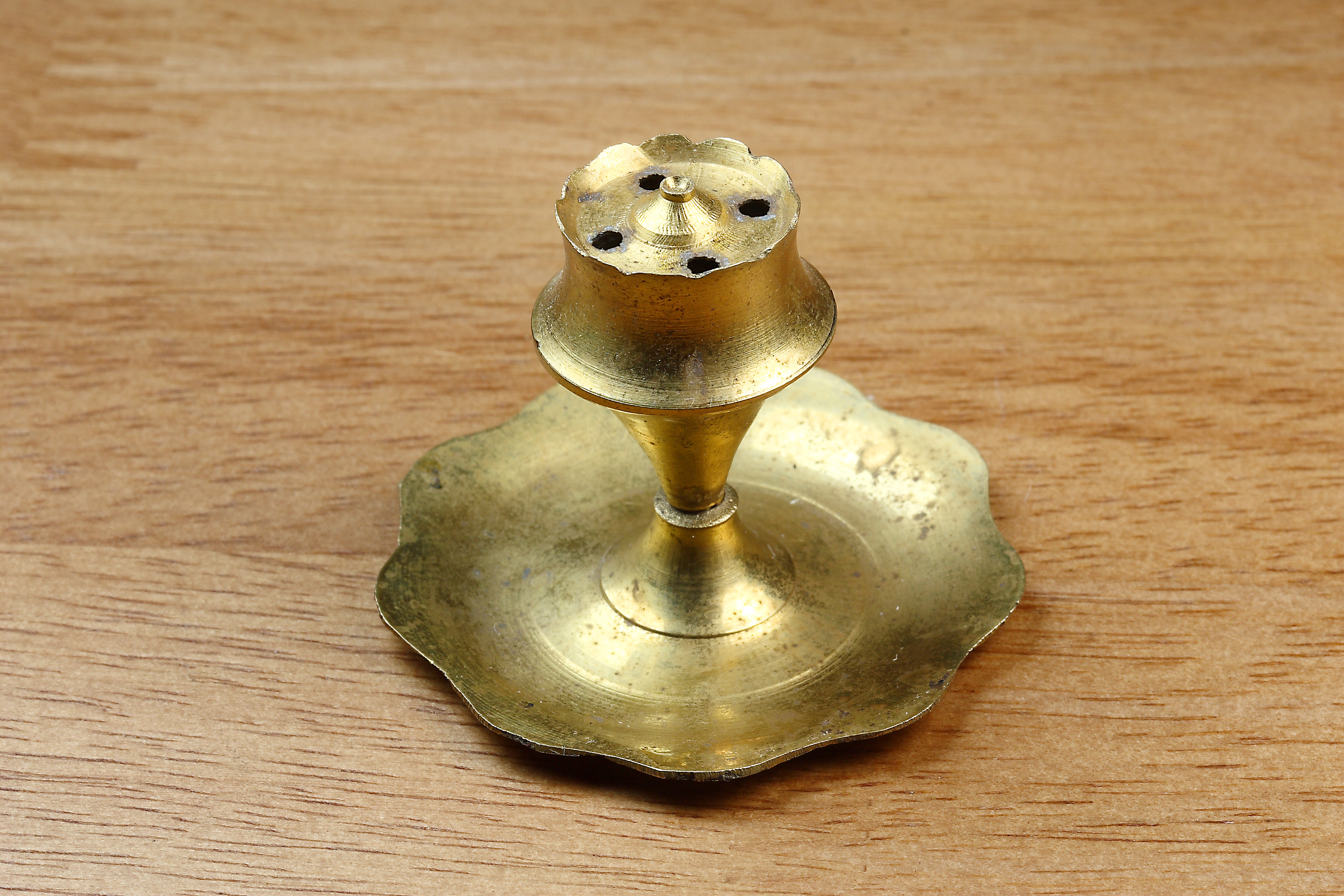
Incense stand used by Hindus to worship deities

Incense in India has been used since 3,600 BC. The use of incense is a traditional and ubiquitous practice in almost all pujas, prayers, and other forms of worship. As part of the daily ritual worship within the Hindu tradition, incense is offered to God (usually by rotating the sticks thrice in a clockwise direction) in his various forms, such as Krishna and Rama. This practice is still commonplace throughout modern-day India and Hindus all around the world. It is said in the Bhagavad Gita that, "Krishna accepts the offering made to Him with love", and it is on this principle that articles are offered each day by temple priests or by those with an altar in their homes and businesses.

Traditionally, the Benzoin resin and resin obtained from the Commiphora wightii tree were used as incense in ancient India. These resins would be spilled over embers which would give out perfumed smoke. However, the majority of the modern-day Incense of India is mostly of a chemical base rather than the natural ingredients.

== Islam ==
Incense is used in several events such as the Tahfidh graduation ceremony, and most notably the regular rite of purifying and cleansing the Ka'aba in Makkah. It is to perfume the air and uplift the souls of pilgrims. According to a hadith (tradition of the Islamic prophet Muhammad):

The first group of people, who will enter Paradise, will be glittering like the full moon and those who will follow them, will glitter like the most brilliant star in the sky. They will not urinate, relieve nature, spit, or have any nasal secretions. Their combs will be of gold, and their sweat will smell like musk. The aloes-wood will be used in their censers. Their wives will be hûr al-ʿayn ("lovely-eyed"). All of them will look alike and will resemble their father Adam in being sixty cubits tall.

== Judaism ==
The 'ketoret' is the incense described in the Bible for use in the Temple. Its composition and usage is described in greater detail in midrash, the Talmud and subsequent rabbinic literature. Although it was not produced following the destruction of the Second Temple in 70 CE, some Jews study the composition of the ancient Temple incense for future use in a restored Temple as part of daily Jewish services.

Contemporary Judaism still uses aromatic spices in one ritual, the Havdalah ceremony ending the Sabbath. In addition, there is a blessing for pleasant smells.

== Mandaeism ==
In Mandaeism, incense (Mandaic: riha) is offered on stands called kinta by Mandaean priests to establish laufa (communion) between humans in Tibil (Earth) and uthras (celestial beings) in the World of Light during rituals such as the masbuta (baptism) and masiqta (death mass), as well as during priest initiation ceremonies. Various prayers in the Qulasta are recited when incense is offered. Incense must be offered during specific stages of the typically lengthy and complex rituals.
