= Tricornis oldi =

Scientific classification
- Kingdom: Animalia
- Phylum: Mollusca
- Class: Gastropoda
- Subclass: Caenogastropoda
- Order: Littorinimorpha
- Family: Strombidae
- Genus: Tricornis
- Species: T. oldi

Binomial name
- Tricornis oldi (Emerson, 1965)

Synonyms
- Strombus oldi Emerson, 1965

Species of gastropod

Tricornis oldi, common name: Old's Conch, is a species of sea snail, a marine gastropod mollusk in the family Strombidae, the true conchs.

== Description ==
The shell size varies between 80 mm and 150 mm.

== Distribution ==
This species is distributed in the Arabian Sea along Oman, and in the Indian Ocean along Somalia.
