= Stacte =

Unknown biblical substance used in incense

Possible contenders for stacte. Top left: Myrrh, natural exudation. Top right: Opobalsamum. Bottom left: Light pieces of myrrh mixed with dark pieces. Bottom right: Light myrrh treated with styrax benzoin.

Stacte (Greek: στακτή, romanized: staktē) and nataph (Hebrew: נָטָף, romanized: nāṭāf) are names used for one component of the Solomon's Temple incense, the Ketoret, specified in the Book of Exodus (Exodus 30:34). Variously translated to the Greek term (AMP: Exodus 30:34) or to an unspecified "gum resin" or similar (NIV: Exodus 30:34), it was to be mixed in equal parts with onycha (prepared from certain vegetable resins or seashell parts), galbanum and mixed with pure frankincense and they were to "beat some of it very small" for burning on the altar of the tabernacle.

This incense was considered restricted for sacred purposes honoring Yahweh; the trivial or profane use of it was punishable by exile, as laid out in Exodus 30:34–38 (KJV).

The Hebrew word nataf means "drop", corresponding to "drops of water" (Job 36:27). The Septuagint translates nataf as stacte, a Greek word meaning "an oozing substance," which refers to various viscous liquids, including myrrh.

The strongest candidates for stacte are golden myrrh (the naturally exuded resin), opobalsamum, and myrrh scented with styrax.

Rabban Shimon ben Gamliel explained, "Stacte is simply the sap that drips from the tapping of the wood of the balsam tree" (Kerithot 6a). Rabbi Saadia Gaon identified it as "mastaki", a term signifying the natural exudate from the myrrh tree (Commiphora myrrha). Stacte was most likely: 1) The light resin which exudes naturally from the myrrh tree before harvest (or a myrrh extract of the highest grade). 2) It may have been a rare myrrh called opobalsamum (mentioned frequently in ancient Jewish writings as "balm" or "balsam"). 3) Alternately it may have been myrrh scented with styrax (Styrax officinalis or Styrax benzoin, a close relative of and of the same genus as Styrax officinalis) These three have the strongest historical and botanical references.

== Contenders for stacte ==
=== Myrrh (the naturally exuded resin) ===
Most ancient sources refer to Stacte as being a product of myrrh. It is variously described as the myrrh that exudes spontaneously from the tree, the transparent parts separated or extracted from the myrrh resin, or the product of myrrh heated over fire.

The ancient Greek botanist Theophrastus described the manufacturing of stacte: "From the myrrh, when it is bruised flows an oil; it is in fact called "stacte" because it comes in drops slowly." The ancient Roman historian Pliny, in Natural History, described stacte as "the liquid which exuded naturally from the myrrh tree before the gum was collected from man-made incisions". Pancirollus described myrrh as a drop or tear distilling from a tree in Arabia Felix, and stacte as a drop of myrrh, which is extracted from it, and yielding a most precious liquid. Dioscorides wrote that stacte was made from myrrh. He recorded that after having bruised the myrrh and dissolved it in oil of balanos over a gentle fire, hot water was poured over it. The myrrh and oil would sink to the bottom like a deposit; and as soon as this has occurred, they strained off the water and squeeze the sediment in a press.

Ben-Yehoshua, et al., write "Stacte, which appears in the Bible in Exodus (30:34), probably refers to the liquid form of myrrh" and states that ancient writers referred to "a naturally flowing gum, called stacte, which sometimes flows from the bark of the tree without any cutting, before the actual harvest."

Stoddart, who lists myrrh as a balm, informs us that "Myrrh—after the almost clear stacte has passed through—is reddish brown ... Stacte is the thinnest moiety of myrrh, the very best of which is forced through tiny holes in the intact bark at the start of spring." Pomet wrote that to obtain stacte one must first gather the myrrh "that flows spontaneously from the tree" and to look for portions of the resin which are "clear and transparent, apt to crumble, light." He says to choose the myrrh "that when it is broke, has little white spots in it." We are told that "stacte is that liquid part which is found in the center or middle of the lumps or clots of myrrh." Pomet also wrote that stacte is that "which is first so gather'd from the tree without force, and also press'd from the myrrh ... there is prepar'd from it, an extract, an oil or liquor of myrrh."

The Gerrhaean tribute to Antiochus III in 205 BC included one thousand talents of frankincense and two hundred of "stacte myrrh."

Cant. 5:5 reads, "I rose up to open to my beloved; And my hands dropped with myrrh, And my fingers with stacte" referring to myrrh and the stacte which seems to have exuded from it. This would seem to agree with Sauer and Blakely who note that stacte was extracted from myrrh.

Abrahams informs that "With regard to the Tabernacle incense, most scholars agree that the term 'stacte' is of Latin and Greek origin, and that stacte represents myrrh." A. Lucas informs us in no uncertain terms that stacte is indeed a product of the myrrh tree. Tucker says that "Common myrrh is obtained from Commiphora myrrha; this is the species from which . . . stacte, was obtained."

R. Steuer, in his scholarly paper "Stacte in Egyptian Antiquity," gives a convincing argument in favor of stacte being the product of the myrrh tree in ancient Egypt.

=== Opobalsamum / Mecca Myrrh ===
Opobalsamum (Commiphora opobalsamum [L.] Engl. Mecca myrrh) is a rare type of myrrh in the genus Commiphora. Some writers believe that stacte was derived from the balsam tree, Commiphora opobalsamum, known as kataf in the Talmud, which grows wild in Yemen, around Mecca, and in Israel. The Revised Standard Version places "opobalsamum" in the margin by Exodus 30:34.

Gamliel said, "Stacte is simply the sap that drips from the tapping of the wood of the balsam tree" (Kerithot 6a). Iluz, et al., write that "researchers (Alpini, 1718; Feliks, 1995; Hepper, 1992; Linnaeus, 1764) have agreed with confidence that balsam is Commiphora gileadensis 1 (=C. opobalsamum), which grows wild today in the dry stony hills around the Red Sea." Ben-Yehoshua, et al., writing about "the most important spices used in religious ritual in ancient Israel" include opobalsamum referring to it as the "balm of Gilead, called also Judaean balsam, Hebrew—tzori, nataf, or Apharsemon (Exodus 30: 34)." Bos, et al., says that stacte is the "oil of the balsam tree, Commiphora opobalsamum, and features in Rabbinic literature."

In Fauna and Flora of the Bible, translators define stacte (nataf) as a resinous, aromatic gum exuding from Commiphora opobalsamum. Van Dam writes that stacte, which many equate with nataf, is a resinous aromatic gum of a balsam tree which he identifies as Commiphora opobalsamum. Some Latin texts of Exodus 30:34 translate stacte as a specie of myrrh, which Abraham states is opobalsamum.

From the genus Commiphora, opobalsamum is a relative of the official myrrh known as Commiphora myrrha and produces a myrrh resin known as Mecca myrrh. Irenaeus referred to "myrrh called opobalsamum." The juice exudes spontaneously during the heat of summer, in resinous drops, but at other times the process is helped by making incisions in the bark. It historically has produced a very pleasant aromatic resin with many alleged medicinal properties. The resin has a strong fragrant smell, with something of the lemon or citron flavour, a scent of vanilla, and the bitter, astringent aroma of Commiphora myrrha.

=== Myrrh scented with Styrax Benzoin ===
Myrrh in antiquity and classical times was seldom myrrh alone but was a mix of myrrh and some other oil. Stacte may have been light myrrh scented with benzoin (benzoin is described in section 2.1 below).

According to Rosenmuller, stacte was myrrh and another oil mixed together. One definition of "myrrh" in the Merriam-Webster Dictionary is myrrh mixed with another aromatic oil. Writers in antiquity and classical times refer often to "mixed myrrh" and "scented myrrh". One kind of myrrh described by Dioscorides was "like the stacte, a composition of myrrh and some other ingredient." Then in another place he wrote that stacte was a mix of two fats (the first natural exudations of myrrh was often referred to as "the fat of fresh myrrh") which included styrax (referred to as storax in antiquity). Dioscordes defining stacte as Styrax and another substance and in another place as Myrrh and another substance seems to bring myrrh and storax together.

Although many scholars cite Styrax officinalis as the biblical storax, it exudes very little resin. This would seem to have necessitated the import of a storax such as Styrax benzoin, which is chemically similar and could have scented the slight bitter note of myrrh and met the demands of making large amounts of incense described in the Bible.

The book of Ecclesiasticus lists storax as one of the ingredients when alluding to the sacred incense of the biblical tabernacle, speaking of "a pleasant odour like the best myrrh, as galbanum, and onyx, and sweet storax, [in antiquity Styrax was referred to as Storax] and as the fume of frankincense in the tabernacle". Either myrrh was treated with storax or by the time of the first temple period a fifth ingredient was added to the ketoret. Myrrh may have been treated with storax or storax oil to further enhance the fragrance. Frederic Charles Cook's commentary on Exodus 30:34 says that it seems by no means unlikely that benzoin was part of the incense of Exodus 30. For centuries, myrrh has been scented with Styrax benzoin, particularly in the Middle East, to scent private homes and places of worship. Myrrh treated with Styrax benzoin exudes qualities similar to that of opobalsamum (Mecca myrrh).

Lucas and Steuer, however, independently insist that stacte is simply a form of myrrh (e.g., a myrrh extract or the light myrrh resin which exudes naturally without harvesting assistance).

The three above candidates are the strongest candidates for stacte.

== Theories concerning lesser candidates ==
There are lesser recognized contenders for the title "Stacte" which should also be mentioned here:

=== Storax / Styrax ===
Storax / Styrax (Styrax officinalis, syn. S. officinale) is a species belonging to the family Styracaceae. Many modern authorities identify stacte with the gum of this storax tree and most commonly referred to by writers as Styrax officinalis or simply as Styrax. One source states that stacte is "the product of the Storax ... [T]he Septuagint name 'Stacte,' derived from the verb 'stazo,' to flow. By metonymy the name of the product, most probably, was transferred to the tree—as was the case in so many other instances among the ancient Israelites . . . [It] must not for a moment be confused or confounded with the Liquid Storax of commerce, which is the product of an altogether different Eastern tree . . . The Talmud contains several references to the Storax plant and its product. Of course in connection with the preparation of the holy incense for the Temple services."

The ancient book of Jubilees, part of the Dead Sea scroll collection found in Qumran, makes reference to storax. Carroll and Siler say that "The Septuagint's translation was most likely in error because it seems unlikely that nataph is a form of myrrh . . . it seems that its translation in the Septuagint as stacte was made simply because both nataph and stacte mean 'to drip' . . . the storax tree seems more likely. Our word storax may even come from the Hebrew tsori."

Benzoin (Styrax benzoin syn. Styrax tonkinensis) is a close relative of and of the same genus as Styrax officinalis above. In his commentary on Exodus 30:34 Frederic Charles Cook wrote that "it seems by no means unlikely that the stacte here mentioned was the gum known as Benzoin, or Gum Benjamin, which is an important ingredient in the incense now used in churches and mosks, and is the produce of another storax-tree (Styrax benzoin) that grows in Java and Sumatra."

Benzoin has a history steeped in antiquity and was once employed by the ancient Egyptians in the art of perfumery and incense. The apothecary of Shemot (Book of Exodus) would have been familiar with its aromatic uses. All the compounds identified in benzoin resin were detected in an archaeological organic residue from an Egyptian ceramic censer, thus proving that this resin was used as one of the components of the mixture of organic materials burned as incense in ancient Egypt. Morfit writes that the priests of Memphis burned benzoin incense every morning. The name "benzoin" is probably derived from Arabic lubān jāwī (لبان جاوي, "Javan frankincense"); compare the mid-eastern terms "gum benjamin" and "benjoin". H.J. Abrahams states that the use of benzoin in the Biblical incense is not inconceivable since Syro-Arabian tribes maintained extensive trade routes prior to Hellenism. Benzoin was available via import to the Biblical lands during the Old Testament era.

According to McClintock and Strong, the Hindustanis use benzoin to burn in their temples-which Strong and McClintoch write is a circumstance strongly in favor of the hypothesis that the stacte of Exodus is a storax.

Many scholars cite Styrax officinalis as the biblical storax, however the yield of resin produced by S. officinalis, if any is produced at all, is extremely small. The large amounts of stacte needed for liturgical purposes, especially in the first temple period, would seem to have necessitated the import of a storax that could have met the demand. Styrax benzoin yields a much larger yield of resin and could fill this need quite adequately. As mentioned above, Styrax benzoin is a close relative of and of the same genus as Styrax officinalis. Herodotus of Halicarnassus in the 5th century BC indicates that different kinds of storax were traded. Gamaliel said that stacte was nothing more than the sap that drips from the branches of the balsam tree. Balsam is a term that has been used for a variety of pleasantly scented vegetable gums that usually contain benzoic acid such as is contained in gum benzoin from the gum benzoin tree.

Dioscordes describes two kinds of stacte: one which is derived from myrrh and one which was derived from storax. He also refers to "another called gabirea ...it also yields much stacte." Houtman writes that stacte refers to myrrh, but is also used for other types of gums.

Rosenmeuller records that "the Greeks also called stacte, a species of storax gum, which Dioscorides describes, as transparent like a tear, and resembling myrrh." In the Orphic Hymns, the Greek word for storax is στόρακας or στόρακα.

One ancient Egyptian perfume formula (1200 BC) consisted of "storax, labdanum, galbanum, frankincense, myrrh, cinnamon, cassia, honey, raisins."

Again, the possibility exists that instead of being stacte itself, Benzoin may have been the agent used for scenting a Myrrh Extract (See section 1.1 above).

=== Liquidambar ===
It is believed by some that Liquidambar was the stacte of antiquity. This ancient product was discovered in King Tut's tomb.

=== Opoponax ===
Opoponax (Commiphora guidottii) is a member of the myrrh family and has been considered to have been stacte. It is sometimes referred to as opobalsamum, and is a relative of but not the true C. opobalsamum.

=== Balsam of Tolu and Balsam of Peru ===
Balsam of Tolu and Balsam of Peru (Myroxylon balsamum) are sometimes called opobalsamum and are sometimes substituted for it, however they are not the true C. opobalsamum. The balsams have a sweet, aromatic, resinous scent with an odour resembling vanilla or benzoin. Both Balsam of Tolu and Balsam of Peru come from the same tree, Myroxylon, but each differs in production. The word Myroxylon is literally "fragrant wood" in Greek, or Quina/Balsamo. The balsams substitute for opobalsamum which some believe to be stacte.

=== Mastic ===
Mastic (Pistacia lentiscus) is a bush which exudes an aromatic resin.

=== Myrrh extract and cinnamon mixed ===
Rosenmuller says that the etymology of the word stacte indicates "to distil", and that it was a distillate from myrrh and cinnamon which was mixed together.

=== Myrrh and Labdanum mixed ===
Moldenke writes that the myrrh of certain parts of Biblical history was actually labdanum. It is believed that many instances in the Bible where it speaks of myrrh it is actually referring to a mixture of myrrh and labdanum. According to the Merriam-Webster Dictionary one of the definitions of "myrrh" is "a mixture of myrrh and labdanum." If what was often referred to as myrrh was actually a mixture of myrrh and labdanum, then the manufacturing of stacte as described by Dioscorides could have reasonably been the product of this myrrh and labdanum mixture.

=== Labdanum ===
Labdanum (loT, stacte; translated "myrrh" in Genesis 37:25, margin "ladanum"; 43:11) The fragrant resin obtained from some species of cistus and called in Arabic ladham, in Latin ladanum. Stacte is described as resin which exudes naturally without a man-made incision. Labdanum exudes from the rock rose bush naturally without any incisions being made.

=== Oil of cinnamon ===
Stacte might have been the sweetly fragrant resin that used to exude spontaneously from Amyris kataf, the bark of which, in other opinions, is the biblical "cinnamon". or may have been the product of the cinnamon tree itself.

Jules Janick writes: "Stacte; unknown, probably oil of cinnamon or cassia or aromatic gem resins."

From Webster's Dictionary: "Stacte: one of the sweet spices used by the ancient Jews in the preparation of incense. It was perhaps an oil or other form of myrrh or cinnamon, or a kind of storax."

=== Balsam ===
Groom defines balsam as simply as "a viscous, resinous exudation from certain trees and shrubs, with a consistency which is thick but not solid. The principle balsams used in modern perfumery are Balsam of Peru, Balsam of Tolu, Balsam of Copaiba, Storax and Balm of Gilead [opobalsamum]. They have in common a vanilla like odor. The words balsam and balm are often used synonymously."

As stated above, some use Balsam of Tolu and Peru as a substitute for opobalsamum (Balm of Gilead), which they believe is the original stacte, because of the similarity of scent (opobalsamum is in the commiphora or the myrrh family). Groom describes the scent of these balsams as vanilla like and referring to Styrax benzoin, he says "the resin from it has a storax-like fragrance . . . and has a vanilla-like fragrance."

Gamaliel wrote, "Stacte is simply the sap that drips from the tapping of the wood of the balsam tree" (Kerithot 6a).
