= Unguis odoratus =

Traditional incense ingredient

Unguis odoratus is a Latin term that refers to a traditional incense ingredient used in many cultures derived from opercula of certain gastropods (slugs and snails). Translated it means: unguis, a noun meaning nail, claw, or fang; and odoratus, an adjective meaning fragrant or perfumed. These opercula were used in medicine and perfumery. Caught in the Red Sea, the Indian Ocean and the Persian Gulf, these shells, thought to have come from Byzantium, reached Europe through the spice trade.

== Identification ==
Some sources identify Unguis odoratus sources from the species Strombus lentiginosus. Other molluscs are also mentioned, such as Chicoreus virgineus, Lambis truncata and Strombus tricornis.
