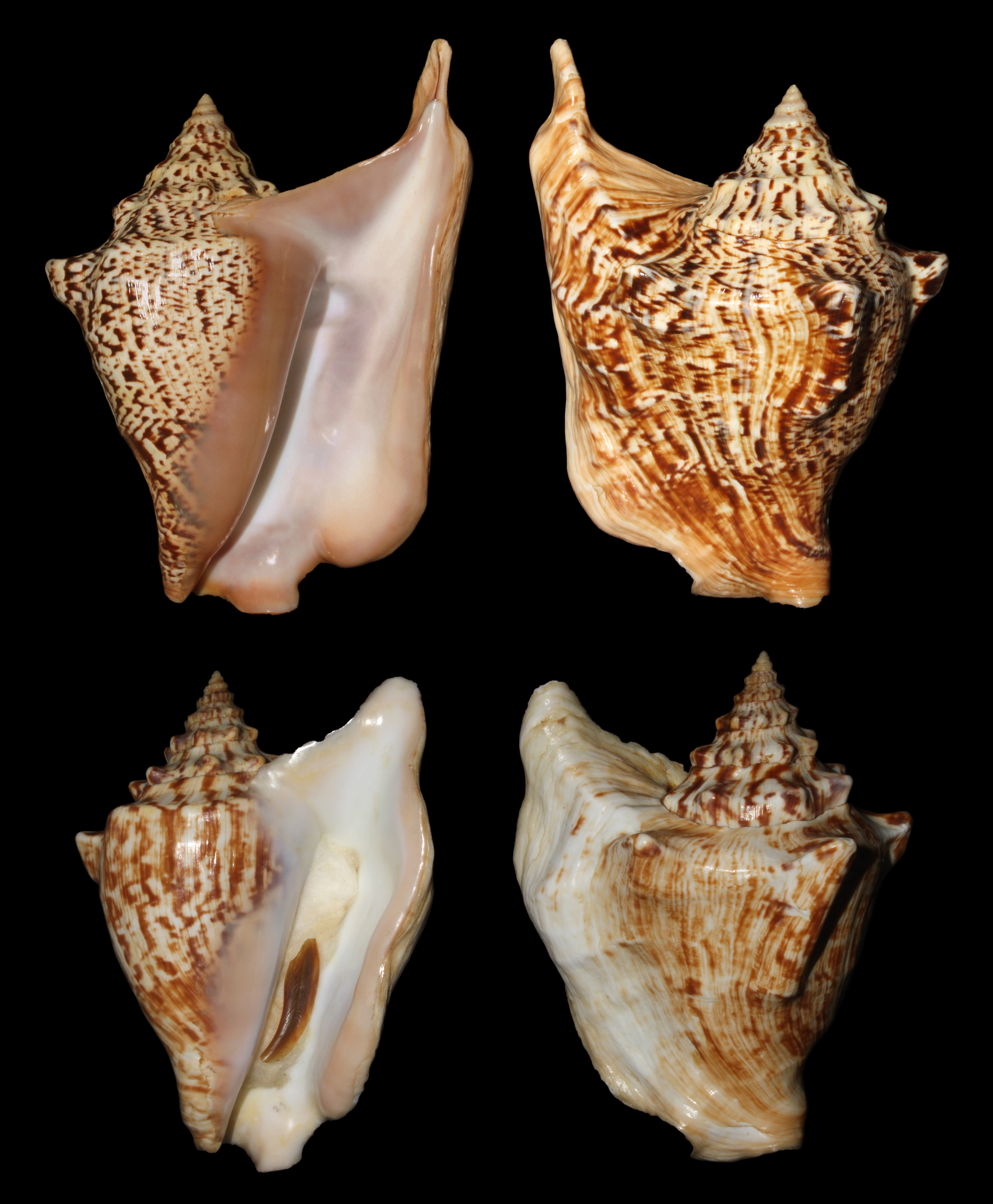
- Two shells of Tricornis tricornis

Scientific classification
- Kingdom: Animalia
- Phylum: Mollusca
- Class: Gastropoda
- Subclass: Caenogastropoda
- Order: Littorinimorpha
- Superfamily: Stromboidea
- Family: Strombidae
- Genus: Tricornis; Jousseaume, 1886

Type species
- Strombus tricornis Lightfoot, 1786

= Tricornis =

Genus of gastropods

Tricornis is a genus of sea snails, marine gastropod mollusks in the family Strombidae, the true conchs.

== Species ==
Species within the genus Tricornis include:

- Tricornis oldi (Emerson, 1965)
- Tricornis tricornis (Lightfoot, 1786)

Species brought into synonymy

- Tricornis raninus (Gmelin, 1791) is a synonym of Lobatus raninus (Gmelin, 1791)
