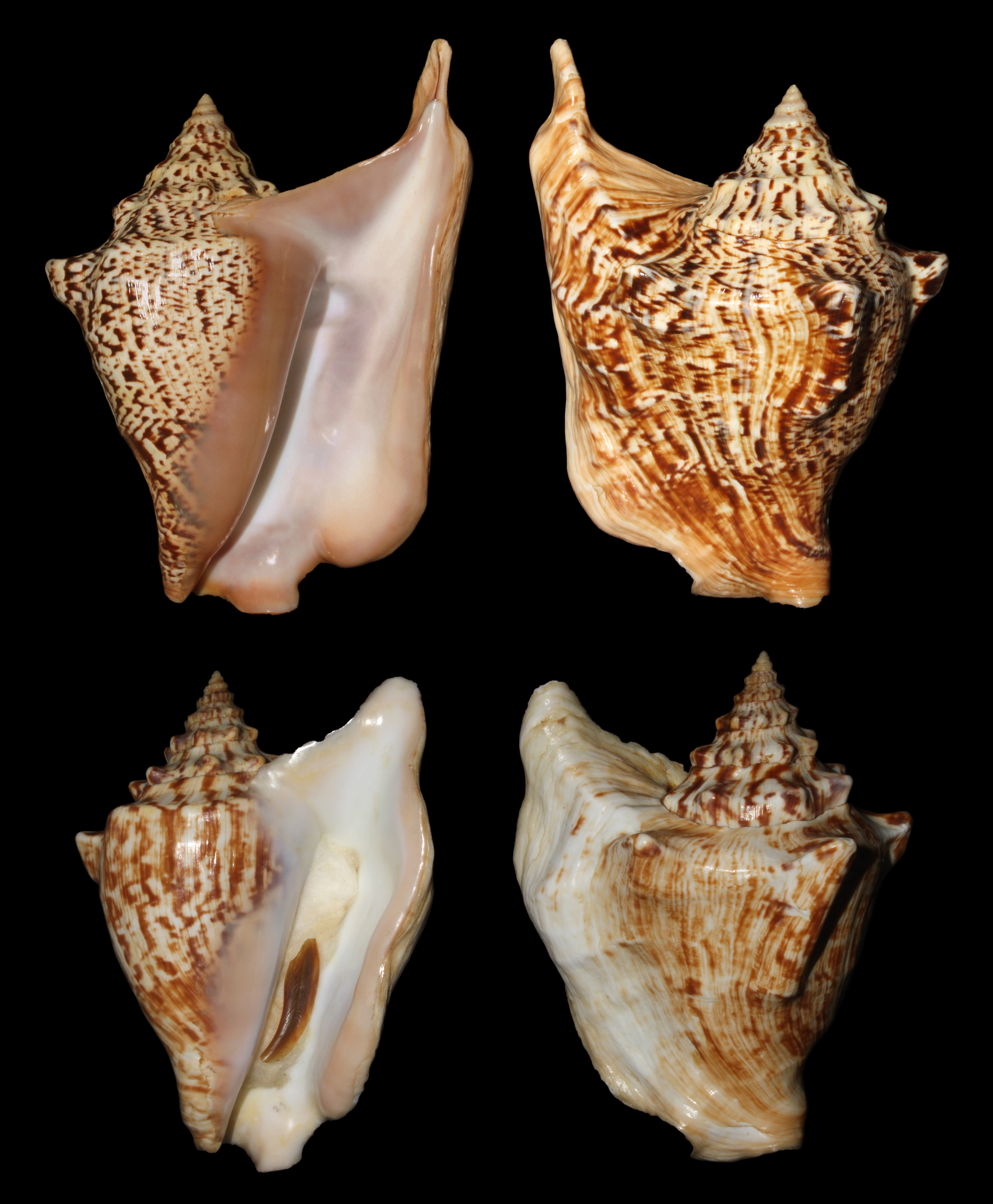
- Two shells of Tricornis tricornis.

Scientific classification
- Kingdom: Animalia
- Phylum: Mollusca
- Class: Gastropoda
- Subclass: Caenogastropoda
- Order: Littorinimorpha
- Family: Strombidae
- Genus: Tricornis
- Species: T. tricornis

Binomial name
- Tricornis tricornis (Lightfoot, 1786)

Synonyms
- Lambis curruca Röding, 1798; Strombus (Tricornis) indecoratus Lorenz & Wiese, 1990; Strombus orientalis Duclos in Chenu, 1844; Strombus pertinax Duclos in Chenu, 1844; Strombus tricornis Lightfoot, 1786 (basionym)

= Tricornis tricornis =

Species of gastropod

Tricornis tricornis, common name the three-cornered conch, is a species of sea snail, a marine gastropod mollusk in the family Strombidae, the true conchs.

== Description ==
The shell length varies between 65 mm and 170 mm.

== Distribution ==
This species occurs in the Red Sea, the Gulf of Aden, the Indian Ocean off Djibouti, Eritrea, and Somalia.
