= Labdanum =

Sticky brown resin produced by Mediterranean shrubs

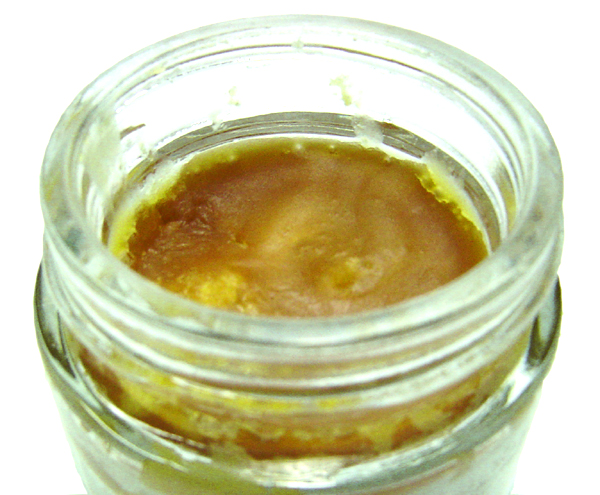
Labdanum resin

Cistus creticus is one source of labdanum.

Labdanum, also called ladanum, ladan, or ladanon, is a sticky brown resin obtained from the shrubs Cistus ladanifer ('gum rockrose', western Mediterranean) and Cistus creticus ('pink rockrose', eastern Mediterranean), species of rock rose. It was historically used in herbal medicine and is still used in the preparation of some perfumes and vermouths.

== History ==
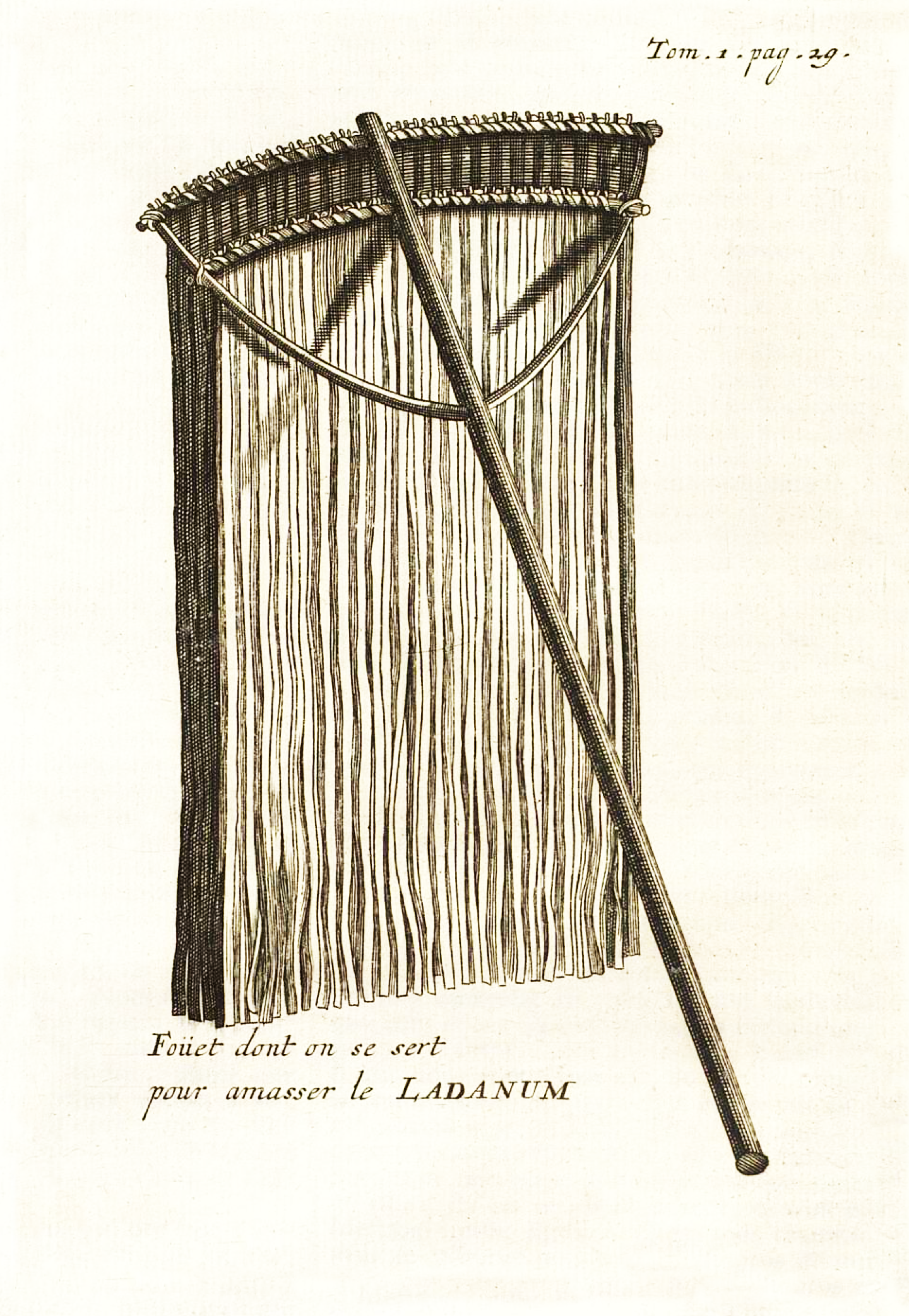
"Whip" used to collect labdanum (Tournefort, 1718, Voyage du Levant)

In ancient times, labdanum was collected by combing the beards and thighs of goats and sheep that had grazed on the cistus shrubs. Wooden instruments used were referred to in 19th-century Crete as ergastiri; a lambadistrion ("labdanum-gatherer") was a kind of rake to which a double row of leathern thongs was fixed instead of teeth. These were used to sweep the shrubs and collect the resin, which was later extracted. It was collected by the shepherds and sold to coastal traders. The resin was used as an ingredient for incense, and medicinally to treat colds, coughs, menstrual problems and rheumatism.

Labdanum was produced on the banks of the Mediterranean Sea in antiquity. In the Hebrew Bible, Genesis 37:25 and 43:11 contains two mentions of labdanum being carried to Egypt from Canaan. The word loṭ (לט 'resin') in these two passages is usually interpreted as referring to labdanum on the basis of Semitic cognates.

Percy Newberry, a specialist on ancient Egypt, speculated that the false beard worn by Osiris and pharaohs may have originally represented a "labdanum-laden goat's beard". He also argued that the sceptre of Osiris, which is usually interpreted as either a flail or a flabellum, was more likely an instrument for collecting labdanum similar to that used in nineteenth-century Crete.

Some scholars, such as Samuel Bochart, H. J. Abrahams, and Saadia Gaon (882–942), state that the mysterious onycha (שחלת šəḥēleṯ), an ingredient in the incense offering mentioned in Exodus 30:34, was actually labdanum.

== Modern uses ==
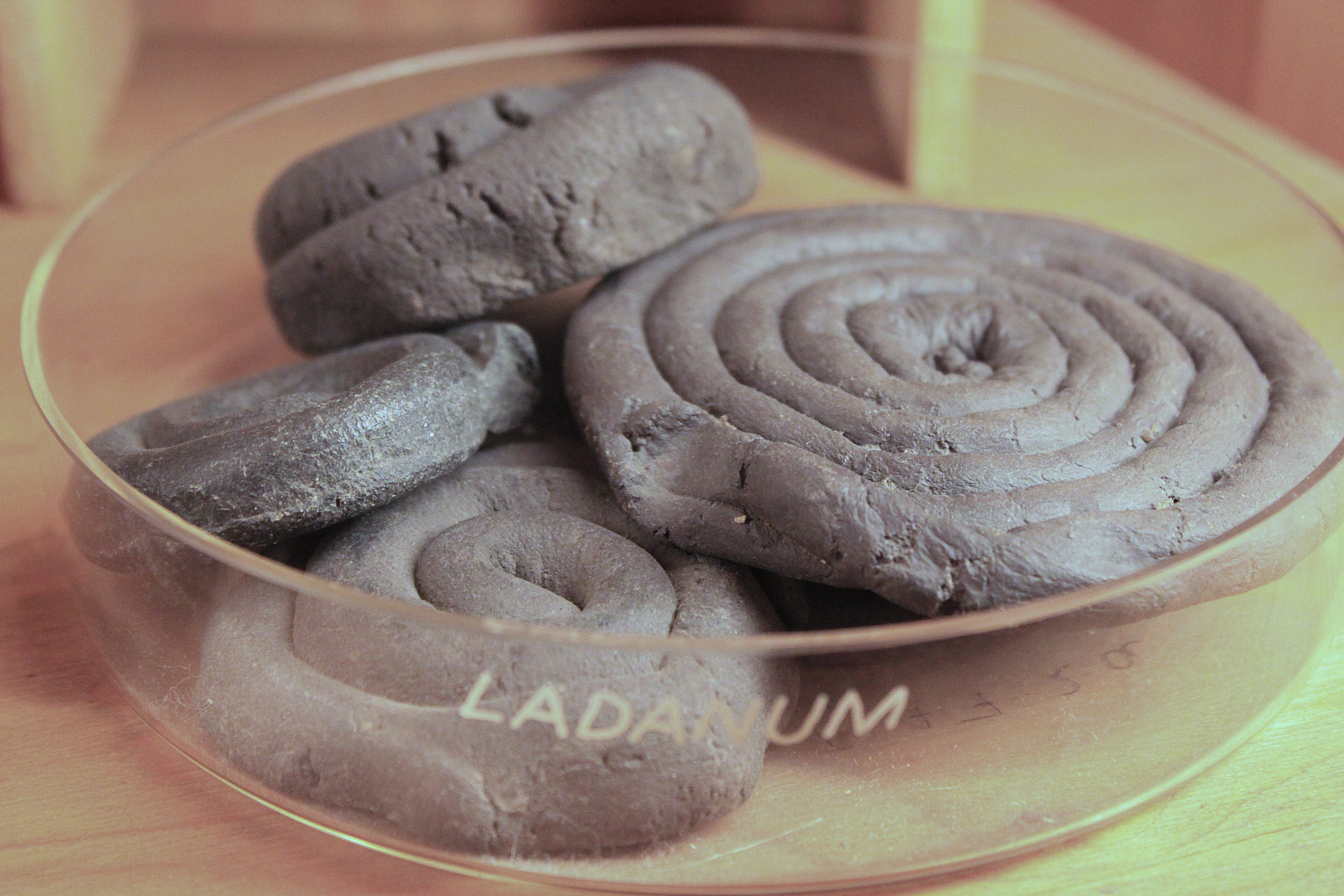
Dried spirals of labdanum for historical medical uses

Labdanum is produced today mainly for the perfume industry. The raw resin is usually extracted by boiling the leaves and twigs. An absolute is also obtained by solvent extraction. An essential oil is produced by steam distillation. The raw gum is a black or sometimes dark brown, fragrant mass containing up to 20% or more of water. It is plastic but not pourable, and becomes brittle with age. The absolute is dark amber-green and very thick at room temperature. The fragrance is more refined than the raw resin. The odour is very rich, complex and tenacious. Labdanum is much valued in perfumery because of its resemblance to ambergris, which has been banned from use in many countries because it originates from the sperm whale, which is an endangered species. Labdanum is the main ingredient used when making the scent of amber in perfumery, as well as chypre fragrances. Labdanum's odour is variously described as amber, sweet, woody, powdery, fruity, animalic, ambergris, dry musk, or leathery.

== See also ==
- Labdane
