= Incense offering =

Offering in Judaism

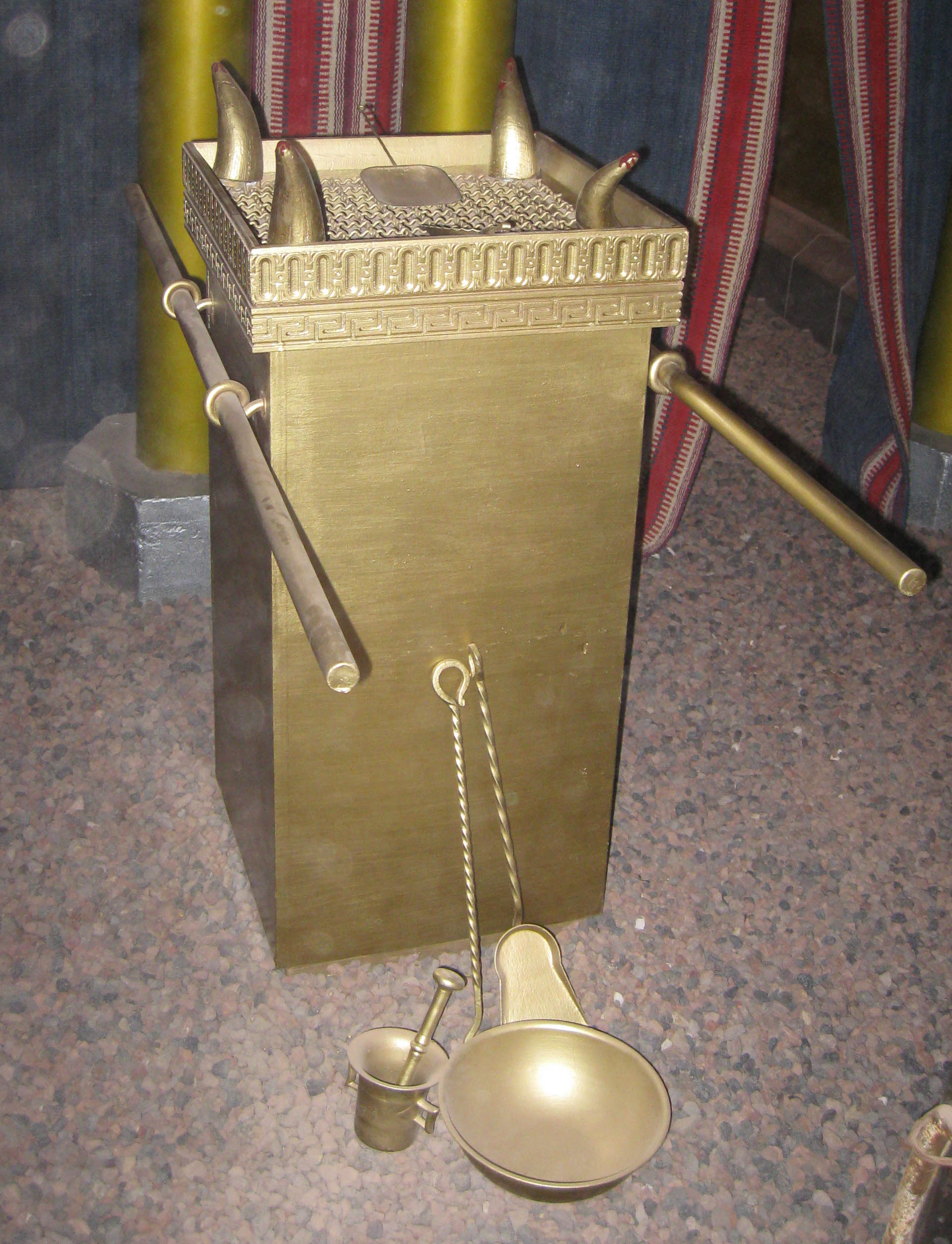
Model of the Golden Altar

The incense offering (Hebrew: קְטֹרֶת qəṭōreṯ) in Judaism was related to perfumed offerings on the altar of incense in the time of the Tabernacle and the First and Second Temple period, and was an important component of priestly liturgy in the Temple in Jerusalem.

== In the Hebrew Bible ==
The sacred incense prescribed for use in the wilderness Tabernacle was made of costly materials that the congregation contributed. The Book of Exodus describes the recipe:

And the LORD said unto Moses: Take unto yourself sweet spices, stacte, and onycha, and galbanum; these sweet spices with pure frankincense: of each shall there be a like weight: And you shall make it a perfume, a confection after the art of the apothecary, tempered together [salted], pure and holy: And you shall beat some of it very small, and put of it before the testimony in the tabernacle of the congregation, where I will meet with you: it shall be unto you most holy. And as for the perfume which you shall make, you shall not make to yourselves according to the composition thereof: it shall be unto you holy for the LORD. Whosoever shall make like unto it, to enjoy the smell thereof, shall even be cut off from his people.

The incense altar was at the end of the Holy compartment of the tabernacle, next to the curtain dividing it off from the Most Holy. According to the Books of Chronicles, there was also a similar incense altar in Solomon's Temple in Jerusalem. Every morning and evening the sacred incense was burned. Once a year, on the Day of Atonement, coals from the altar were taken in a censer, or fire holder, together with two handfuls of incense, into the Holy of Holies, where the incense was made to smoke before the mercy seat of the ark of the testimony.

The Book of Exodus lists four components of the incense, while the Talmud lists seven additional components from the oral Torah. The four components from the Book of Exodus are:

- stacte (נָטָף naṭaf)
- onycha (שְׁחֵלֶת sheħeleth)
- galbanum (חֶלְבְּנָה ħelbbinah)
- pure frankincense (לְבוֹנָה זַכָּה levonah zakah)

The components are still being studied and are not determined with absolute certainty. Stacte is variously described as being the extract of the transparent portion of the myrrh resin which exudes spontaneously from the tree, or a balsam from a tree such as opobalsamum or a styrax. Onycha, which in Greek means "nail", is variously described as being the operculum from a shell found in the Red Sea (which is said to resemble a fingernail), the exudation from the rock rose bush called labdanum (both petals and markings which are said to resemble a fingernail), Styrax benzoin, bdellium, or even cloves. Galbanum is generally considered to be Ferula galbaniflua. Also considered is a milder variety from the Levant or possibly even a close relative of Ferula galbaniflua called narthex or giant fennel. Pure frankincense is the resin of a tree of the boswellia species.

In the second Book of Chronicles, altars of incense accompanied the altars to Ba'al:

And they broke down the altars of the Ba'als in his presence; and he hewed down the incense altars which stood above them;

— 2 Chronicles 34:4 (RSV)

In the Book of Jeremiah, incense was specifically burned on altars to Ba'al in the cities of Judah:

For your gods have become as many as your cities, O Judah; and as many as the streets of Jerusalem are the altars you have set up to shame, altars to burn incense to Ba'al.

— Jeremiah 11:13 (RSV)

In the Book of Isaiah, the destruction of altars of incense are mentioned in conjunction with the destruction of idols to Asherah:

Therefore by this the guilt of Jacob will be expiated, and this will be the full fruit of the removal of his sin: when he makes all the stones of the altars like chalkstones crushed to pieces, no Ashe'rim or incense altars will remain standing.

— Isaiah 27:9 (RSV)

== In Hellenistic Judaism ==
Josephus mentions the incense, numbering thirteen ingredients.

== In rabbinic literature ==
The rabbis of the Talmud expanded the description of the recipe for the incenses from 4 ingredients of the Hebrew Bible to 11 ingredients. as follows:

The Rabbis taught: How is the incense mixture formulated? Three hundred and sixty eight mina were in it: three hundred sixty five corresponding to the days of the solar year - a mina for each day, half in the morning and half in the afternoon, and three extra mina, from which the Kohen Gadol would bring both his handfuls [into the Holy of Holies] on Yom Kippur. He would return them to the mortar on the day preceding Yom Kippur, and grind them very thoroughly so that they would be exceptionally fine. Eleven kinds of spices were in it, as follows: (1) stacte, (2) onycha, (3) galbanum, (4) frankincense - each weighing seventy mina [and each comprising 19.02% of the total weight]; (5) myrrh, (6) cassia, (7) spikenard, (8) saffron, each weighing sixteen "mina" [and each comprising 4.35% of the total weight]; (9) costus - twelve mina [comprising 3.26% of the total weight]; (10) aromatic bark - three "mina" [comprising 0.82% of the total weight]; and (11) cinnamon - nine "mina" [comprising 2.45% of the total weight]; [Additionally] Carshina lye, nine kab; Cyprus wine, three se'ah and three kab - if he has no Cyprus wine, he brings old white wine; Sodom salt, a quarter-kab; and a minute amount of maaleh ashan. Rabbi Nathan of Babylon says: Also a minute amount of Jordan amber. If he added honey, he invalidated it; if he [deliberately] omitted one of the spices, he was liable to the death penalty. Rabbi Shimon ben Gamaliel says: The stacte is nothing more than the sap that drips from the branches of the balsam tree. Why was Carshina lye brought? To refine the onycha, that it be pleasant. Why was Cyprus wine brought? To steep the onycha, that it be pungent; while urine (מי רגליים - mei raglaiim) was more suited for this, nevertheless, one did not bring urine into the Temple, out of respect.

According to the Talmud, the House of Avtinas was responsible for compounding the qetoret incense in the days of the Second Temple.

== In Christianity ==
The New Testament makes several typological references to incense, including a Christological reference to the coals from the altar of incense taken behind the veil on the Day of Atonement (Hebrews 9:3–4), and a reference to the prayers of believers as incense (Revelation 5:8). In later Christian typology the smoke of incense in the tabernacle typically signifies offered prayer. This was developed in medieval Christian art. In the Catholic Church, the Eastern Orthodox Church and a considerable part of the Anglican Church, and among some Lutheran churches as well, incense is still used in liturgical rites as well as in some popular devotions outside of church liturgies.

== See also ==
- Incense offering in rabbinic literature
- Kyphi, incense used in ancient Egypt
- Riha (Mandaeism), incense used for religious rituals
- Stacte
