= Kyphi =

Incense used in ancient Egypt

Aa9 p Z7 D12 Z2ss ,
V31 G1 R5 p X1 ,
Aa7 p Z7 N38
kp.t
Determ: grains, incense
in hieroglyphs

Kyphi, cyphi, or Egyptian cyphi is a compound incense that was used in ancient Egypt for religious and medical purposes.

== Etymology ==
Kyphi (Latin: cyphi) is romanized from Greek κυ̑φι for Ancient Egyptian "kap-t", incense, from "kap", to perfume, to cense, to heat, to burn, to ignite. The word root also exists in Indo-European languages, with a similar meaning, like in Sanskrit कपि (kapi) "incense", Greek καπνός "smoke", and Latin vapor.

== History ==
According to Plutarch (De Iside et Osiride) and the Suda (s. v. Μανήθως), the Egyptian priest Manetho (ca. 300 BCE) is said to have written a treatise called "On the preparation of kyphi" (Περὶ κατασκευη̑ϛ κυφίων), but no copy of this work survives. Three Egyptian kyphi recipes from Ptolemaic times are inscribed on the temple walls of Edfu and Philae.

Greek kyphi recipes are recorded by Dioscorides (De materia medica, I, 24), Plutarch and Galen (De antidotis, II, 2).

The seventh century physician Paul of Aegina records a "lunar" kyphi of twenty-eight ingredients and a "solar" kyphi of thirty-six.

== Production ==
The Egyptian recipes have sixteen ingredients each. Dioscorides has ten ingredients, which are common to all recipes. Plutarch gives sixteen, Galen fifteen. Plutarch implies a mathematical significance to the number of sixteen ingredients.

Some ingredients remain obscure. Greek recipes mention aspalathus, which Roman authors describe as a thorny shrub. Scholars do not agree on the identity of this plant: a species of Papilionaceae (Cytisus, Genista or Spartium), Convolvulus scoparius, and Genista acanthoclada have been suggested. The Egyptian recipes similarly list several ingredients whose botanical identity is uncertain.

The manufacture of kyphi involves blending and boiling the ingredients in sequence. According to Galen, the result was rolled into balls and placed on hot coals to give a perfumed smoke; it was also drunk as a medicine for liver and lung ailments.

=== Dioscorides (10 ingredients) ===
- honey
- wine
- raisins
- myrrh
- juniper berries
- cyperus (Greek κύπειρος)
- turpentine (pine or terebinth resin, Greek ῥητίνη)
- aspalathus (Greek ἀσπάλαθος)
- calamus (Ancient Egyptian "kanen", Hebrew קָנֶה, Greek κάλαμος, Latin culmus)
- rush (Greek σχοῖνος)

=== Plutarch (+6 ingredients) ===
- seseli (Greek σέσελι)
- mastic (Greek σχῖνος)
- bitumen
- sorrel
- cardamom
- small juniper berries (?)

=== Galen (+5 ingredients) ===
- cassia
- cinnamon (cardamom may substitute)
- saffron
- bdellium
- spikenard

=== Egyptian (+6 ingredients) ===
- cassia
- cinnamon
- mastic
- mint
- henna
- mimosa

== See also ==
- Ketoret
- Riha (Mandaeism)
