= List of 10th-century religious leaders =

This is a list of the top-level leaders for religious groups with at least 50,000 adherents, and that led anytime from January 1, 901, to December 31, 1000. It should likewise only name leaders listed on other articles and lists.

== Christianity ==
=== Chalcedonian Christianity ===
- Church of Rome (complete list) –

- Benedict IV, Pope (900–903)
- Leo V, Pope (903–904)
- Sergius III, Pope (904–911)
- Anastasius III, Pope (911–913)
- Lando, Pope (913–914)
- John X, Pope (914–928)
- Leo VI, Pope (928–929)
- Stephen VII, Pope (929–931)
- John XI, Pope (931–935)
- Leo VII, Pope (936–939)
- Stephen VIII, Pope (939–942)
- Marinus II, Pope (942–946)
- Agapetus II, Pope (946–955)
- John XII, Pope (955–964)
- Benedict V, Pope (964)
- Leo VIII, Pope (964–965)
- John XIII, Pope (965–972)
- Benedict VI, Pope (973–974)
- Benedict VII, Pope (974–983)
- John XIV, Pope (983–984)
- John XV, Pope (985–996)
- Gregory V, Pope (996–999)
- Sylvester II, Pope (999–1003)

- Church of Constantinople (complete list) –

- Antony II Kauleas, Patriarch (893–901)
- Nicholas I Mystikos, Patriarch (901–907, 912–925)
- Euthymius I Synkellos, Patriarch (907–912)
- Nicholas I Mystikos, Patriarch (901–907, 912–925)
- Stephen II of Amasea, Patriarch (925–928)
- Tryphon, Patriarch (928–931)
- Theophylact, Patriarch (933–956)
- Polyeuctus, Patriarch (956–970)
- Basil I Scamandrenus, Patriarch (970–974)
- Antony III the Studite, Patriarch (974–980)
- Nicholas II Chrysoberges, Patriarch (984–996)
- Sisinnius II, Patriarch (996–998)
- Sergius II, Patriarch (1001–1019)

=== Miaphysite Christianity ===
- Armenian Apostolic Church (complete list) –

- Sarkis I, Catholicos (992–1019)

- Coptic Orthodox Church of Alexandria (complete list) –

- Philotheos, Pope (979–1003)

== Islam ==
=== Sunni ===
- Abbasid Caliphate, Baghdad (complete list) –

- al-Mu'tadid, Caliph (892–902)
- al-Muktafi, Caliph (902–908)
- al-Muqtadir, Caliph (908–929, 929–932)
- al-Qahir, Caliph (929, 932–934)
- al-Radi, Caliph (934–940)
- al-Muttaqi, Caliph (940–944)
- al-Mustakfi, Caliph (944–946)
- al-Muti, Caliph (946–974)
- at-Ta'i, Caliph (974–991)
- al-Qadir, Caliph (991–1031)

- Caliphate of Córdoba (complete list) –

- Abd ar-Rahman III, Caliph (929–961)
- Al-Hakam II, Caliph (961–976)
- Hisham II, Caliph (976–1008, 1010–1012)

=== Shia ===
- Twelver Islam

- Imams (complete list) –
- Muhammad al-Mahdi, Imam (874–present) Shia belief holds that he was hidden by Allah in 874.

- Deputies (complete list) –
- Abu Jafar Muhammad ibn Uthman, Deputy (880–917)
- Abul Qasim Husayn ibn Ruh al-Nawbakhti, Deputy (917–938)
- Abul Hasan Ali ibn Muhammad al-Samarri, Deputy (938–941)

- Marja
- Kulayni(930-941)
- Ibn-e Qūliwayh(941-977)
- Shaykh Saduq (977-993)
- Al-Sharif al-Radi(993-1015)

- Isma'ili Islam (complete list) –

Fatimid Caliphate in Tunisia
- Abdullah al-Mahdi Billah, Imam (881–934) and Fatimid Caliph (909–934)
- Al-Qa'im bi-Amr Allah, Caliph and Imam (934–946)
- Al-Mansur bi-Nasr Allah, Caliph and Imam (946–953)
- Al-Mu'izz li-Din Allah, Caliph and Imam (953–975)
Transfer to Egypt in 973
- al-Aziz Billah, Caliph and Imam (975–996)
- al-Hakim bi-Amr Allah, Caliph and Imam (996–1021)

- Zaidiyyah (complete list) –

Tabaristan
- Hasan al-Utrush, leader (914–917)
- Abu Muhammad Hasan ibn Qasim, Imam (917–919, 919–923, 927–928)
- Abu 'l-Husayn Ahmad ibn Hasan, Imam (919, 923)
- Abu 'l-Qasim Ja'far ibn Hasan, Imam (919, 923–925)
- Abu Ali Muhammad ibn Abu 'l-Husayn Ahmad, Imam (925–927)
- Abu Ja'far Husayn ibn Abu 'l-Husayn Ahmad, Imam (927)
Yemen
- al-Hadi ila'l-Haqq Yahya, Imam (897–911)
- al-Murtada Muhammad, Imam (911–913)
- an-Nasir Ahmad, Imam (913–934 or 937)
- al-Muntakhab al-Hasan, Imam (934–936 or 939)
- al-Mukhtar al-Qasim, Imam (936–956)
- al-Mansur Yahya, Imam (934–976)
- ad-Da'i Yusuf, Imam (977–999)
- al-Mansur al-Qasim al-Iyyani, Imam (999–1002)

== Judaism ==
- Exilarch (complete list) –

- Ukba, Exilarch (deposed, reinstated 918, deposed soon after)
- David ben Zakkai, Exilarch (921–940)

=== Karaite Judaism ===
- Exilarch (complete list) –
  David ben Boaz (10th century)
  Solomon ben David (late 10th–early 11th centuries)

=== Talmudic Academies in Mesopotamia ===
- Pumbedita Academy (complete list) –

- Kimoi ben R. Ahhai, Gaon (896–905)
- Mebasser Kahana ben R. Kimoi, Gaon (905–917)
- Kohen Tzedek Kahana ben Joseph, Gaon (917–922)
- Zemah ben Kafnai, Gaon (935–937)
- Hananiah ben Yehudai, Gaon (937–943)
- Aaron ibn Sargado, Gaon (943–960)
- Nehemiah ben Kohen Tzedek, Gaon (960–968)
- Sherira Gaon, Gaon (968–1006)

- Sura Academy (complete list) –

- Hilai ben Natronai ben Hilai, Gaon (896–904)
- Shalom ben Mishael, Gaon (904)
- Jacob ben Natronai, Gaon (911–924)
- Yom-Tob Kahana ben R. Jacob, Gaon (924)
- Saadia Gaon, Gaon (928–942)
- Joseph ben Jacob, Gaon (930)
- Zemah Tzedek ben Paltoi ben Isaac, Gaon (c.990–c.998)
- Samuel ben Hofni, Gaon (c.998–c.1012)

=== Palestinian Gaonate ===
- Aaron ben Meïr, Nasi (early tenth century)

== See also ==
- Religious leaders by year
- List of state leaders in the 10th century
- Lists of colonial governors by century
