= Responsa of the Geonim =

Responsa written by the rabbis of the Geonic Period

Responsa of the Geonim (Hebrew: תשובות הגאונים) are responsa written by rabbis of the Geonic period in response to questions addressed to them.

== Style ==
In the geonic period the elucidative letter and the scholarly responsum are characterized by a developed and rounded literary style. The Mishnah and Talmud had been definitively completed and were recognized as authoritative, and, being committed to writing, were accessible to scholars, even though they lived far from the academies, the seats of Talmudic learning. With an accurate knowledge of the Talmud and a correct interpretation of it, scholars might deduce for themselves rulings for any of the specific cases which might present themselves. Even in instances in which the questioner was not versed in the Talmud and the responsum was required to give only a brief decision on the case under consideration, the ruling was not a mere "yes" or "no," "permitted" or "forbidden," "right" or "wrong," but in the shortest responsa themselves it was generally the custom for the scholars who prepared them to cite a passage from the Talmud in support or proof of their decisions, or to controvert any possible opposition on the basis of some other Talmudic passage by a refutation of it and a correct exegesis of the section of the Talmud in question. In most instances, however, the questioner himself knew the Talmudic passage from which he might draw the ruling for any specific case, the problem being whether he was able to apply this passage correctly. There were cases, on the other hand, in which he was either altogether ignorant of the application, or made it falsely, thus reaching an erroneous conclusion. In such instances the respondent was required to give an explanation of the Talmudic passage in question and its correct application to the specific case, often proving the correctness of his decision by a comparison with another passage, and adding a refutation of any other possible interpretation. He was frequently obliged, moreover, to take into consideration any consequences which might result from his decision or exegesis, and was constrained many times to explain points which, strictly speaking, had not been asked specifically, although they were more or less closely related to the subject under discussion. Many of these questions have no practical contingencies for their basis, but are concerned with the correct comprehension and explanation of certain passages of the Talmud, and the corresponding responsa are therefore restricted to detailed elucidations and fundamental interpretations. In the main, therefore, the geonic responsa are scholarly treatises, although this does not characterize them all to an equal degree, since in the course of the four centuries of the geonic period the responsum developed, in form and character, and was subjected to many changes.

== Earlier Geonim ==
In the days of the earliest geonim, the majority of the questions asked them were sent only from Babylonia and the neighboring lands, where the inhabitants were more or less acquainted with the Talmud and could, in case considerable portions of it were unintelligible to them, visit the academies in the Kallah months to hear Talmudic interpretations and explanations. The questions which were submitted in writing were accordingly limited to one or more specific cases, while the responsum to such a query gave in brief form the required ruling and a concise reason for it, together with a citation of an analogous Talmudic instance and a refutation of any possible objection.

== Later Geonim ==
More discursive were the responsa of the later geonim after the first half of the ninth century, when questions began to be sent from more distant regions, where the inhabitants were less familiar with the Talmud, even if they possessed it, and were less able to visit the Babylonian academies, the only seats of Talmudic learning. Talmudic difficulties were often the subject of these inquiries.

Although a gaon declared it difficult to write elucidations of perplexing problems in many Talmudic passages, he sought, nevertheless, to give such interpretations for entire treatises and themes in the Talmud. In like manner, even those responsa which were not sent to distant lands assumed a discursive and prolix form, for though the questioner sought information only for a specific case and requested a Talmudic basis for it, the responsum was not restricted to the mere decision which might be deduced from the Talmudic passage under consideration, but included the entire context as well. It thus frequently contained more than a simple basis and foundation for the ruling drawn from the Talmud, and discussed the subject under consideration in fullest detail and in all its import, even though this had not been requested. More than this, other subjects which had but a slight bearing on the problem in question received their quota of discussion; and the respondent added also the ruling which would have been given had the point at issue been slightly different from that on which information was requested.

=== Mode of reply ===
The later geonim did not restrict themselves to the Mishnah and Talmud, but used the decisions and responsa of their predecessors, the elder geonim, whose sayings and traditions were generally regarded as authoritative, although there were occasional exceptions, such as the assertion of Hai Gaon that the ruling of Rabbi Naṭronai was incorrect. These responsa of the later geonim were, strictly speaking, disquisitions on Talmudic themes, and since a single letter often answered many questions, it frequently attained the compass of an entire book. The letters of the Geonim, which, for the most part, contained replies to many problems, assumed a definite and official form. They began with the statement that the questions had been correctly received, read, and considered, and that the corresponding answers had been given in the presence of the gaon and with his approval. The introductory formula, used in the letters of the Geonim, may be illustrated by the following example:

"Amram ben Sheshna, head of the academy of the city of Meḥasya [Sura], to all scholars and their disciples and to those of our brethren of the house of Israel who dwell in Barcelona, and who are dear, beloved, and revered unto us, may their prosperity increase and wax great! Receive ye greeting from us and from Rabbi Ẓemaḥ, the president of the court, from the heads of the Kallah ["reshe Kallah"], from the authorized teacher, and from all other scholars and disciples of the academy, all of whom ever pray for your health, that God in His great mercy may have compassion on you. The questions which ye have laid before us we have caused to be read unto us, while the president of the court and the allufim and the other sages and disciples sat before us. We have studied them, and weighed all that is written in them, and with divine help have given to them the following answers."

In other introductions are found the concluding words:

"We commanded and directed that the answers to your questions be written you as we have perceived them with the help of God".

This citation shows that there were regular secretaries who prepared the letters, and it is likewise clear that the judicial board and its president formulated the replies and then presented them to the gaon, who approved and signed them if they were found correct. After this general introduction the various questions and their answers were given in regular order in the letter. Each question was introduced by the phrase "she-sh'altem" (= "as to what ye have asked"), and was then repeated, either word for word or in content. The answer to each question then followed, either without any introductory phrase, or with the words, "thus is it," "the answer to this question is," "if the matter is as your letter of inquiry states, it seems to us as follows," "we regard it thus," "thus the sages say," "thus have we learned from earlier sages," "know ye," or "thus hath Heaven revealed unto us," which, however, is simply equivalent to the phrase "with divine help we have found." The answer was frequently concluded with the formulas, "thus is the final decision" ("halakha"), "thus is the correct practise," "thus is the usage in the academies," or "such cases come daily before the academies, and in them all we decide thus." After all questions and their answers had been given, the formal conclusion of the letter came. Occasionally this was the brief phrase, "may God grant us to decide according to the Law, and to teach according to valid decision", but more frequently, especially when the letter was sent to foreign lands, it concluded with a blessing on him who had asked the question, such as:

"May the King of Honour open for thee the light of our eyes, and for all the scholars of Kairouan, joy of our heart, our friend, our colleague, the gates of wisdom and the gates of understanding, and clothe you with a mantle of glory".

==== Language ====
Geonic responsa are written in three languages, Hebrew, Aramaic, and Arabic. In the earliest period, Aramaic, the language of the Gemara, prevailed exclusively, but in the middle of the ninth century Hebrew began to appear in the responsa side by side with it. This innovation was doubtless due, on the one hand, to the study and knowledge of Hebrew (which spread through rabbinical circles as a result of the Karaite movement), and, on the other, to the fact that the rulings of the Geonim were thenceforth sent to distant lands, where the inhabitants were unfamiliar with Aramaic, so that it became necessary to write to them in Hebrew, the dialect of the Mishnah. When Arabic became the prevailing language of the Jews in the dominions of the caliphs, questions were frequently addressed to the Geonim in that tongue, whereupon the scholars of the academies used the same language in reply, thus accounting for the mass of Arabic responsa.

== Collections of Geonic responsa ==
Some of the responsa that have survived are unmutilated and in their original form, while others are extant only in extracts.

- The first collection appeared, together with brief geonic rulings, at Constantinople in 1516 under the title Halakot Pesukot min ha-Geonim (Brief Rulings of the Geonim).
- In 1575, another corpus, titled She'elot u-Teshubot me ha-Geonim, was published in the same city.
- In 1792, Nissim ben Ḥayyim edited a collection of geonic responsa at Salonica under the title Sha'are Tzedek (Gates of Justice), which contains 533 responsa arranged according to subject, and an index by the editor. For the majority of these responsa the name of the author is cited, and many of them are reproduced in their original form with their Talmudic proofs and disquisitions.
- In 1848, David Cassel issued his corpus, which was entitled Teshubot Geonim Ḳadmonim (Responsa of the Earliest Geonim).
- Ten years later, in 1858, another collection was published at Leipzig with the title Sha'are Teshubah.
- In 1863, a collection of responsa was published at Jerusalem with the title Ḥemdah Genuzah.
- In the following year, Jacob Mussafia edited his Teshubot ha-Geonim at Lyck,
- Seven years later, in 1871, Nachman Nathan Coronel published Teshubot ha-Geonim in Vienna.
- In 1882, Ḥayyim M. Horowitz published at Frankfurt a number of geonic responsa under the title Toratan shel Rishonim (Responsa of the Earlier Authorities).
- The most important corpus of responsa is that contained in a manuscript of the Royal Library of St. Petersburg and edited by Abraham Harkavy under the title Teshubot ha-Geonim (Berlin, 1885), which includes many Arabic decisions, while numbers of the rulings still preserve the name of the questioner and the date of his inquiry.
- Another corpus of geonic responsa has been edited by Joel Müller in his Teshubot Geone Mizraḥ u-Ma'arab (Responsa of the Geonim of the East and West), Berlin, 1885.
- Another collection is that edited by Louis Ginzberg on the basis of Genizah fragments and entitled Genizah Studies (1905).

In addition to these collections, a number of geonic responsa have been published in other works, as in the Ṭa'am Zeḳenim of Eliezer Ashkenazi of Tunis (Frankfurt, 1854) and the Ḳebuẓat Ḥakamim of W. Warnheim (Vienna, 1861), as well as in the halakhic works of older authorities, such as the Halakhot of Rabbi Asher ben Jehiel and the responsa of Rabbis Shlomo ibn Aderet and Meir of Rothenburg.

The responsa of the Geonim were by no means restricted to problems of legalism or ritualism, but in addition referred to all departments of human life and knowledge, treating of liturgical, theological, philosophical, exegetic, lexicographical, archeological, and historical questions; and they likewise contain abundant material for a study of the conditions of the times in which they were written, and for the culture-history and the commercial relations of the Jews, as well as for a knowledge of the manners and customs then prevailing in Judaism. A few examples of brief geonic responsa may be cited as characteristic of the views and customs of the times:

"As to what ye have asked: 'How is it with regard to the theft of non-Jewish property in cases where it has not already been forbidden as a desecration of the divine name?' thus is our ruling: The prohibition of theft has naught to do with desecration of the divine name, but is a clearly established law which forbids any theft whatever from a non-Jew. Desecration of the divine name is mentioned only in association with objects which have been lost. According to Rabbi Phinehas ben Jair, 'Whensoever it leads to a desecration of the divine name, one is forbidden to appropriate anything which a non-Jew has lost.' The vine said to have been abstracted from the garden of a Gentile by Rav Ashi was evidently taken in return for compensation," etc.

"And as to what ye have asked: 'After the burial of a corpse many wipe their hands on the ground,' no such custom prevails among us. And as to what ye have heard: 'While returning from the cemetery many are wont to wash their hands before reaching the house and to sit down on the way; what is the reason for this?' thus is our opinion: The washing of the hands is not obligatory, but where it is the custom one should wash them. The bidding of the sages that one must sit down seven times while returning from a corpse is intended to apply solely to the case in which one goes to the place of burial and returns from it, and solely for the kinsmen, and solely for the first day, and, above all, solely for those places where the usage is customary. The sevenfold repetition of sitting down is on account of the evil spirits which follow the returning mourners, that a demon may disappear each time the bereaved sit down".

The famous Letter of Sherira Gaon, which is the chief historic source for the Talmudic and geonic periods, was a responsum of this character, sent in reply to the questions of an African community.

== See also ==
- History of responsa in Judaism
