= Rav Ena =

Rav Ena (Hebrew: רב עינא, read as Rav Ena) was a Jewish Savora sage of the second generation of the Savora era. He headed the Sura academy and was a counterpart of R. Simuna, head of the Yeshiva in Pumbedita. According to the Iggeret Rav Sherira Gaon, R. Ena and R. Simuna added-on anonymous annotations to the Babylonian Talmud, during the process of the Savora arrangement of the Talmud, that included adding additional clarification and Halkhaic rulings. Some scholars identify him with Rav Giza (רב גיזא). He died in year 540 AD (שנת ד'ש'; Hebrew calendar).
