= Rabbai of Rob =

Rabbai of Rob (Hebrew: רב רבאי מרוב, read as Rav Rabbai me-Rov; or Hebrew: רב רבאי דמן רוב, read as Rav Rabbai deman-Rov) was a Jewish Savora sage of the third generation of the Savora era. He headed the Pumbedita Yeshiva after R. Simuna died in 540 AD (בשנת ד'ש'; Hebrew calendar). He was a fellow-townsmen of Rob city, nearby Nehardea. During his days, the teaching at Pumbedita was interrupted due to governmental predestinations against the Jewish community and their persecution, and thus the sages along with their pupils moved to Firuz Shapur, nearby Nehardea. Just like the rest of the Savora sages active during the Savora era, not much is known about him, since the Savora sages did not write independent works, and their annotations to the Talmud were added anonymously, without citing the name of the sage. The very few known of him or others, is based almost completely upon the Iggeret Rav Sherira Gaon.
