= Pumbedita Academy =

Jewish yeshiva in Babylon

- Type: Seminary
- Active: ca. 260 CE–1038 CE
- Founders: Judah bar Ezekiel
- Religious affiliation: Rabbinic Judaism
- Location: Pumbedita, Iraq

The Pumbedita Academy or Pumbedita Yeshiva (Hebrew: ישיבת פומבדיתא; sometimes Pumbeditha, Pumpedita, Pumbedisa) was a Talmudic academy in Pumbedita, an unidentified location in modern Iraq, during the Amoraic and Geonic eras. It was founded by Judah bar Ezekiel around 260 CE and, with the Sura Academy founded in 225 by Abba Arika, retained dominant influence for about 800 years.

== History ==
After Abba Arikha and Samuel of Nehardea died at the end of the first generation of the Amoraim, along with the designation of Rav Huna as dean Sura, Judah bar Ezekiel went to the city of Pumbedita and had established a new yeshiva there. The yeshiva of Pumbedita, founded approximately in 260 CE, continued the tradition of Nehardea and became synomymous with his teaching. The Pumbedita Academy was active for about 800 years over the course of the eras of the Amoraim, Savoraim, and Geonim up until the days of Hai Gaon.

At the time, the academies of Pumbedita and Sura became the most influential and dominant yeshivas of the Jewish communities' world, and all Torah decrees and other religious rulings were issued from these Yeshivas to all the Jewish diaspora. Pumbedita Academy served as a field of growth to the greatest Jewish sages for generations to come, among them: Rabbah bar Nahmani ("Rabbah"), Rav Yosef b. Hiyya, Abaye and Amora sage Rava, Savora sages Rabbah Jose and Simuna, and Geonim Rab Rabbah Gaon and Paltoi ben Abbaye Gaon, as well as Sherira Gaon and his son, Hai Gaon. Pumbedita Academy was at its peak during the third and fourth generation of the Amoraim. During the days of the Amora sage Rava, Pumbedita Academy moved to Mahuza (מחוזא, modern al-Mada'in), but after his death, it returned to Pumbedita. The academy declined after Rava's death in 353 and many rabbis from Pumbedita founded academies in other cities in Babylonia.

Later, with the sealing of the Talmud by Ravina II Sura, the era of the Savoraim (499-589) began, in which most part of that period, proper studying on a regular basis no longer took place in Sura, only in Pumbedita.

During the era of the Geonim, the two Talmudic academies were correspondingly active as well. One of Pumbedita's Gaons and dean of the Academy, Hai Gaon (approximately in years 988-990), moved the academy to Baghdad because the number of Jews making a living from agriculture was growing smaller and they were migrating to the big cities, mainly to Baghdad (apart from the phenomenon of Jewish emigration out of Babylonia). However, the academy's name remained "Pumbedita Academy" despite its relocation.

The last period of Pumbedita Academy growth took place during the days of Sherira Gaon and his son, Hai Gaon. Thousands of letters with halachic issues attached were received at Pumbedita, addressed to the heads of the Academy from all around the Jewish diaspora. The Geonim of the Academy worked hard to respond to their questions. Along with Hai Gaon's death (c. 1038), the era of the Geonim ended.

Hezekiah Gaon and Bostanai were appointed deans of Pumbedita Academy, the only men to be simultaneously a Gaon and Exilarch. Twenty years later, Hezekiah Gaon, by some accounts, was tortured to death by the Muslim Buyid dynasty and Pumbedita Academy closed.

== List of Pumbedita academy's deans ==
=== Amora era ===
- Judah bar Ezekiel:
  - the 1st Rosh yeshiva (and a disciple of Abba Arika and Samuel of Nehardea)
- Huna b. Hiyya
- Rabbah bar Nahmani ("Rabbah")
- Rav Yosef b. Hiyya
- Rava:
  - After Abaye's death the academy was united under him and moved to Mahuza (al-Mada'in)
- Rav Nachman bar Yitzchak
- Rav Kahana IV
- Aha b. Raba
- Rav Rahumi I
- Sama b. Rabba

=== Savora era ===
- Rabbah Jose
- Simuna
- Rabbai of Rob:
  - The academy was relocated to Firuz Shapur Anbar due to pogroms against Jews, and moved back to Pumbedita city after 50 years

=== Geonim era ===
- Hanan of Iskiya – from 589
- Mari ben R. Dimi Sargo – around 591
- Rav Hana (Huna) – around 630
- Rav Ravah (Rava) – 651
- Rav Bosai (Bostanai) – around 660
- Huna Mari ben Mar R. Joseph – around 689
- Hiyya of Meshan – around 700
- Rav Rabya ben R. Abaye (Moronai) – around 710
- Natronai b. Mar Nehemiah (called Mar R. Yanka) – 719
- Judah Gaon – around 730
- Joseph Gaon ben Kitnai (called Mar Kitnai) – 739–748
- Samuel ben Mar R. Mari – 748–755
- Natroi Kahana b. Emuna (Natrunai, ha-Kohen) – around 755–761
- Abraham Kahana (ha-Kohen) – apparently 761
- Dodai ben R. Nahman (Rav Dorai) (brother of R. Yehudai, Gaon of Sura Academy) – 761–767
- R. Hananya ben R. Mesharsheya – 767–771
- Malka ben R. Aha – 771–773
- Rabba ben R. Dodai (Abba) (ancestor of R. Sherira Gaon) – 773–782
- Rav Shinwai (Shinui) – in 782
- Haninai Kahana ben Abraham (ha-Kohen) – 782–786
- Huna ben ha-Levi ben Isaac – 786–788
- Manasseh ben R. Joseph – 788–796
- Isaiah ha-Levi ben R. Abba – 796–798
- Joseph ben R. Shila of Shilhe – 798–804
- Kahana ben Haninai Gaon (ha-Kohen) – 804–810
- Abumai Kahana ben Abraham (Ikhomai, ha-Kohen) – 810–814
- Joseph ben R. Abba – 814–816
- Abraham ben R. Sherira – 816–828
- Joseph ben Mar R. Hiyya – 828–833
- Isaac ben R. Hananiah (Hunai, Hiyya) – 833–839
- Joseph ben R. Abba (R. Rabbi, Ravrevay) – 839–841
- Paltoi ben Abaye – 841–858
- Aha Kahana ben Mar Rav (ha-Kohen) – in 858
- Menahem ben R. Joseph ben Hiyya – 858–860
- Mattithiah ha-Kohen b. Ravrevay b. Hanina (R. Rabbi) – 860–869
- Abba ben Ammi ben Samuel (Rabba) – 869–872
- Zemah ben Paltoi Gaon – 872–889
- Hai ben R. David – 898–890
- Kimoi ben R. Ahhai Gaon (Qimoi, ha-Kohen, Ahi) – 896–905
- Mebasser Kahana ben R. Kimoi Gaon (ha-Kohen, Qimoi) – 905–917
- Kohen Tzedek Kahana ben Joseph (father of Nehemiah ben Kohen Tzedek) – 917–922
- Zemah ben Kafnai (Pappai) – 935–937
- Hananiah ben Yehudai Gaon (Judah) (father of R. Sherira Gaon) – 937–943
- Aaron ibn Sargado – 943–960
- Nehemiah ben Kohen Tzedek – 960–968
- Sherira Gaon – 968–1006, Passed the torch to his son Hai Gaon, while he was still alive. The Iggeret Rav Sherira Gaon ("[The] Epistle of Rav Sherira Gaon") is accounted as an important historian source, especially to Jewish history.
- Hai Gaon ben Sherira – 1004, died in 1038. His death is considered the conclusion of the era of the Geonim sages.
- Exilarch Hezekiah Gaon – 1038–1040 – was killed by a Muslim ruler of the Buyid dynasty, although there were accounts that he was freed from prison and reinstalled at the head of the academy.

== See also ==
- History of the Jews in Iraq
- Talmudic Academies in Babylonia
  - Firuz Shapur, modern-day Anbar, a town adjacent or identical to Nehardea; academy of Pumbedita was moved to this town for half of the 6th century
  - Mahuza, modern-day Al-Mada'in; the academy of Pumbedita was relocated to Mahuza during the time of the Amora sage Rava
  - Nehardea Academy (in Nehardea)
  - Pumbedita, seat of Pumbedita Academy for most of its history, located somehwere in modern Iraq
  - Pum-Nahara Academy
  - Sura Academy, in Sura (city) – the political center of Jewish Babylonia after Nehardea
- Talmudic Academies in Syria Palaestina (in the Land of Israel)

== Sources ==
- Brody, Robert (2011). "Pumbedita". In Berlin, Adele (ed.). The Oxford Dictionary of the Jewish Religion. Oxford University Press. ISBN 978-0-19-973004-9.
