= Iggeret of Rabbi Sherira Gaon =

Literary work composed by Sherira Gaon

Iggeret of Rabbi Sherira Gaon (Hebrew: אגרת רב שרירא גאון), also known as the Letter of Rav Sherira Gaon, and the Epistle of Rav Sherira Gaon, is a responsum penned in the late 10th century (987 CE) in the Pumbedita Academy by Sherira ben Hanina, the Chief Rabbi and scholar of Babylonian Jewry, to Rabbi Jacob ben Nissim of Kairouan, in which he methodologically details the development of rabbinic literature, bringing down a chronological list of the Sages of Israel from the time of the compilation of the Mishnah, to the subsequent rabbinic works (Tosefta, Sifra, Sifre, etc.), spanning the period of the Tannaim, Amoraim, Savoraim, and Geonim under the Babylonian Exilarchs (Jewish Babylonian Aramaic: רֵאשׁ גלותא Rēsh Galūthā), concluding with his own time. Therein, Sherira ben Hanina outlines the development of the Talmud, how it was used, its hermeneutic principles, and how its lessons are to be applied in daily life whenever one rabbinic source contradicts another rabbinic source. It is considered one of the classics in Jewish historiography.

== Letter's content ==
Sherira's letter (henceforth: Iggeret), in its length, takes the form of a short book. In it, Sherira endeavored to answer an inquiry from Kairouan about the authorship and composition of the Mishnah and Talmud, and in particular why earlier authorities are seldom cited by name and the authorities that are so cited do not seem to be chronologically continuous. Sherira is one of the first to present a detailed discussion on the Savoraim, including their activity in revising and finishing the Talmud. The letter he wrote is the chief source for the history of the Talmudic, post-Talmudic, and geonic periods. Jacob ben Nissim of Kairouan addressed, in the name of his community, a number of questions of historical interest to Sherira, inquiring especially into the origin of the Mishnah and the sequence of the redactions, the origin of the Tosefta, and the sequence of the Talmudic, post-Talmudic, and geonic authorities. The reply seeks to clarify the basic principles upon which the chain of transmission of the Oral Law is founded.

Sherira clearly and lucidly answers all these questions, throwing light upon many obscure passages of Jewish history. This historical responsum, which is composed half in Aramaic and half in Hebrew, reveals Sherira as a true chronicler, with all the dryness and accuracy of such a writer, though his opinions on the princes of the Exile belonging to the branch of Bostanai, as well as on some of his contemporaries, are not entirely unprejudiced. As narrator of the history of Halakhah in the course of the first millennium. The literary topoi of his historical account have some parallels to the Islamic historical genre – the ṭabaqāt. As a chronicler, he exposes monumental documented information about the rabbis and the Babylonian communities, especially the Jewish seats of learning (academies) at Sura and Pumpeditha. Sherira also relates to the persecution under Yazdegerd II. Apparently, he also refers to some mythical imagery while reconstructing the chronology of the Halakhah as a profound historical picture.

This letter is included in the Ahimaaz Chronicle, but it has also been edited from manuscripts by B. Goldberg and under the title "Iggeret Rab Sherira Gaon"; also by J. Wallerstein, under the title "Sherirae Epistola." The best edition of this letter prior to 1900 is that by Adolf Neubauer. The best modern source for the letter is the edition of B.M. Lewin, in which the French and Spanish recensions are printed side by side. Most later editions are based on one or other of these.

All dates appended in Sherira's work are according to the Seleucid era counting. Modern translations of the Iggeret have converted these dates into their corresponding Gregorian calendar date for easy comprehension.

Another letter by Sherira, also addressed to Jacob ben Nissim of Kairouan, deals with the various titles given to the Talmudic sages, as "Rabban," "Rabbi," "Rab," and "Mar," and explains why some sages are simply mentioned by their names, without the addition of any titles.

== Editions ==
The Iggeret exists in its original Aramaic both in "French" and "Spanish" recensions. The "French" recension is written completely in Aramaic, while the "Spanish" recension (now at the Vienna National Bibliothek, Ms. Hebr. 120) is a 13th or 14th-century copy written on paper, in what appears to be North African or Greek rabbinic script, measuring 270 x 202 mm, and composed of a higher proportion of Hebrew. The two recensions appear to differ on the question of whether the Mishnah was recorded in writing by Rabbi Judah haNasi. The Spanish recension definitely says that it was. The French recension appears to say that it was not, and this was the traditional view among Ashkenazi Jews. However, the notes to a recent edition of the French recension argue that the French wording is also consistent with the Mishnah having been written down. The scholarly consensus, up to and including Solomon Schechter, was that the "Spanish" recension was the original version, and this is strongly urged by Rabbi Israel Moses Hazan. More recent scholarship holds that the names are wrongly attributed: the so-called "French" version is the older, but is in fact a product not of France but of Spain.

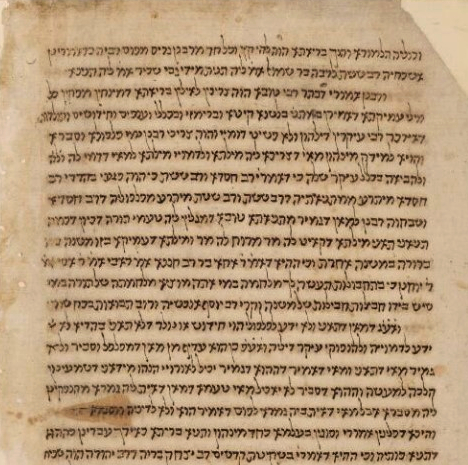
A 14th-century copy of Iggeret Rav Sherira Gaon (Courtesy of the Österreichische Nationalbibliothek)

A partial translation of the Iggeret was made in English in 1975 by David M. Goodblatt, and a complete translation in English made by R. Nosson Dovid Rabinowich in 1988 where he conflates both the Spanish and French editions in his new translation, especially where he thought one text would lend greater clarity to the subject. Earlier translations were made of the Iggeret in Latin, French, and Hebrew, although of poor quality.

A sequel to the Iggeret is Sefer ha-Qabbalah written by Rabbi Abraham ibn Daud.

== Bibliography ==
- Brody, Robert (2013). The Geonim of Babylonia and the Shaping of Medieval Jewish Culture. New Haven, CT: Yale University Press. ISBN 978-0300189322. OCLC 898028875.
- Filipowski, Z. (1857). Sefer HaYuchasin HaShalem (in Hebrew). London: Ḥevrat meʻorere yeshenim. OCLC 1037578511.
- Goodblatt, David M. (1975). Rabbinic Instruction in Sasanian Babylonia. Leiden: Brill. pp. 22–27. OCLC 1654598.
- Kahane, A. (1922). Sifrut HaHistoria HaYisraelit (in Hebrew). Vol. 1. Warsaw. OCLC 11695880.
- Landau, L. (1904). Epitre Historique du R. Scherira Gaon (Traduite de l'hébreu moderne -- araméen et commentée avec une introduction) (in French). Antwerp: Anvers Imp. L. Bary. OCLC 977254898.
- Lewin, Benjamin Manasseh (1972). Iggeret Rav Sherira Gaon (in Hebrew and Aramaic). Jerusalem. OCLC 233343783.; Lewin's addenda not reprinted in this edition (first printed in a 1910 Berlin publication entitled "Prolegomena zu einer neuen Ausgabe vom Sendschreiben des R. Sherira Gaon", and reprinted in Jaffa in 1917, in Frankfurt in 1920, and in Jerusalem in 1944)
- Neubauer, Adolf (1887). Mediaeval Jewish Chronicles. Anecdota oxoniensias. Semitic series. Oxford. ISBN 1-145-09335-3. OCLC 490748486.
- Sherira Gaon (1988). The Iggeres of Rav Sherira Gaon. Translated by Nosson Dovid Rabinowich. Jerusalem: Rabbi Jacob Joseph School Press - Ahavath Torah Institute Moznaim. OCLC 923562173.
- Wallerstein, Josue (1861). Scherirae Quae Dicitur Epistola (Interpretatione Lativa Advolationibus et Criticis et Exegeticis Instructa) (in Latin). Krotochini: B.L. Monasch. OCLC 876614004.
