= Pum-Nahara Academy =

Jewish yeshiva academy in Babylon

Pum-Nahara Academy (Hebrew: ישיבת פום נהרא) was a Jewish Yeshiva academy in Babylon, during the era of the Jewish Amora sages, in the town of Pum-Nahara, Babylonia, that was within the area of jurisdiction of Sura city, and was situated on the east bank of the "Sura" river, nearby the Sura river's estuary to the Tigris river, and thus it was granted its name (Pum = in Aramaic "mouth" or "lips" (i.e. "waterside"); Nahara = River; Hence, "The waterside of the River"). According to the Talmud, the Jewish community in Pum-Nahara city, were poor. The dean of the Yeshiva academy, that was third in the line of importance (after Pumbedita and Sura academies), out of four Yeshiva academies that existed at the time in Babylonia, was Rav Kahana III, who was the Rabbi teacher of Rav Ashi, and a disciple of Rabbah bar Nahmani ("Rabbah"). Rav Kahana III also resided at Pum-Nahara (and thus also known as Rav Kahana of Pum-Nahara). One may note some additional Jewish Amora sages that resided and were active at the time at Pum-Nahara, and among them: R. Aha b. Rab, who later became an Exilarch, as well as Rab b. Shaba.

== See also ==
- History of the Jews in Iraq
- Talmudic Academies in Babylonia
  - Firuz Shapur, modern-day Anbar, a town adjacent or identical to Nehardea; academy of Pumbedita was moved to this town for half of the 6th century
  - Mahuza, modern-day Al-Mada'in; the academy of Pumbedita was relocated to Mahuza during the time of the Amora sage Rava
  - Nehardea Academy (in Nehardea)
  - Pumbedita Academy (in Pumbedita for most of its history, near modern-day Fallujah)
  - Sura Academy, in Sura (city) - the political center of Jewish Babylonia after Nehardea
- Talmudic Academies in Syria Palaestina (in the Land of Israel)
