= Rabbinic Judaism =

Orthodox form of Judaism since the 6th century AD

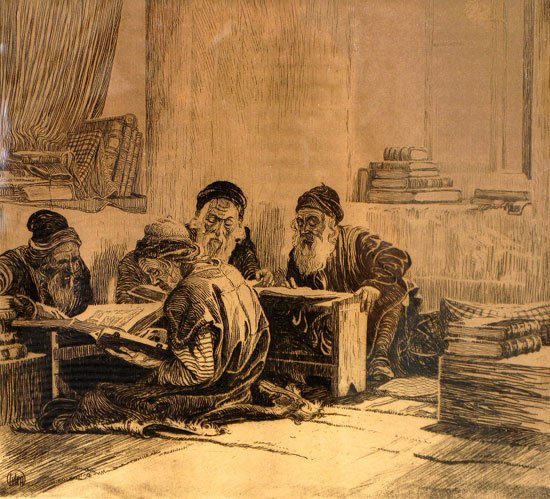
Talmud students

Rabbinic Judaism (Hebrew: יהדות רבנית, romanized: Yahadut Rabanit), also called Rabbinism, Rabbinicism, or Rabbanite Judaism, is rooted in the many forms of Judaism that coexisted and together formed Second Temple Judaism in the land of Israel, giving birth to classical rabbinic Judaism, which flourished from the 1st century CE to the final redaction of the Talmud in c. 600. Mainly developing after the destruction of the Jerusalem Temple in 70 CE, it eventually became the normative form of Judaism.

Rabbinic Judaism has been an orthodox form of Judaism since the 6th century CE, after the codification of the Babylonian Talmud. It has its roots in the Pharisaic school of Second Temple Judaism and is based on the claim that Moses at Mount Sinai received both the Written Torah (Torah she-be-Khetav) and the Oral Torah (Torah she-be-al Peh) from God. The Oral Torah explains the Written Torah, and the rabbis claimed that it was they who possessed this memorized and orally transmitted part of the divine revelation. At first, it was forbidden to write down the Oral Torah, but after the destruction of the Second Temple, it was decided to write it down in the form of the Talmud and other rabbinic texts for the sake of preservation.

Rabbinic Judaism contrasts with the non-Rabbinic forms which emphasize the Tanakh over the Talmud, including the defunct Sadducee Judaism as well as with Karaite Judaism, Ethiopian Judaism, and Samaritanism, which do not recognize the Oral Torah as a divine authority nor the rabbinic procedures used to interpret Jewish scripture (e.g., the Hebrew Bible). Although there are now profound differences among Jewish denominations of Rabbinic Judaism with respect to the binding force of Halakha (Jewish religious law) and the willingness to challenge preceding interpretations, all identify themselves as coming from the tradition of the Oral Law and the rabbinic method of analysis.

== Background ==
=== Second Temple Judaism ===
==== Hellenistic Judaism ====
In 332 BCE, the Persians were defeated by Alexander the Great. After his demise and the division of Alexander's empire among his generals, the Seleucid Kingdom was formed. During this time, currents of Judaism were influenced by Hellenistic philosophy developed from the 3rd century BCE, notably among the Jewish diaspora in Alexandria, culminating in a Greek translation of the Hebrew Bible known as the Septuagint. An important advocate of the symbiosis of Jewish theology and Hellenistic thought is Philo.

Hellenistic culture had a profound impact on Jewish customs and practices, both in Judea and in the diaspora. These inroads into Judaism gave rise to Hellenistic Judaism in the Jewish diaspora, which sought to establish a Hebraic-Jewish religious tradition within the surrounding Hellenist culture and language.

There was a general deterioration in relations between Hellenized Jews and other Jews, leading the Seleucid king Antiochus IV Epiphanes to effectively outlaw the observance of Judaism, replace the High Priest Jason with Menelaus—who had bribed Antiochus for the position—and syncretize the Temple worship of the God of Israel with the worship of Zeus. Consequently, the Jews who rejected Hellenism revolted against the Greek ruler, forming a Jewish kingdom of varying degrees of autonomy or independence ruled by the Hasmonean dynasty, which lasted from 110 BCE to 37 BCE. The Hasmonean dynasty eventually disintegrated into a civil war. The competing leaders appealed to Rome for intervention, which in time led to a total Roman conquest and annexation of the region (see Iudaea province).

Nevertheless, the region's cultural issues remained unresolved. The main issue separating Hellenistic and other Jews was the application of biblical laws in a Hellenistic melting pot culture.

Hellenistic Judaism spread to Ptolemaic Egypt from the 3rd century BCE, becoming a notable religio licita throughout the Roman Empire until its decline in the 3rd century concurrent with the rise of Gnosticism and early Christianity.

The decline of Hellenistic Judaism remains obscure. It may have been marginalized, absorbed into, or become early Christianity (see the Gospel of the Hebrews). The Acts of the Apostles, at least, report how Paul the Apostle preferentially evangelized communities of Jewish proselytes, Godfearers, and non-Jewish circles sympathetic to Judaism: the Apostolic Decree, which authorized proselytes to forgo circumcision, made Christianity an easier option for interested pagans in the empire than did Judaism (see also circumcision controversy in early Christianity).

However, nascent Christianity's attractiveness may have suffered a setback when it was explicitly outlawed in the 80s CE by Domitian as a "Jewish superstition", while Judaism retained its privileges as long as Jews paid the Fiscus Judaicus. However, from a historical perspective, the state's persecution of Christians seemed only to increase the frequency of pagan conversions to Christianity, leading eventually to the adoption of Christianity by the Roman emperor Constantine the Great, himself a convert.

On the other hand, mainstream Judaism began to reject Hellenistic currents, outlawing the use of the Septuagint (see also the Council of Jamnia). Remaining currents of Hellenistic Judaism may have merged into Gnostic movements or early Rabbinic Judaism in the early centuries CE.

=== Periodization and development ===
Classical rabbinic Judaism is seen as consisting of three separate strata: tannaitic (until 200 CE), amoraic (200–500 CE), and saboraic (500 CE–7th century).

The views of the Tannaim, who witnessed the destruction of the Second Temple in 70 CE and the defeat of the Bar Kokhba revolt of 132–135 CE, are preserved in the Mishnah (finalized c. 200 CE), a law code constituting the first phase of formative rabbinic Judaism. The late-2nd-century Tosefta ("supplement, addition") was another piece of oral tradition put to paper by rabbinic authors. The two Talmuds (Jerusalem and Babylonian) are also their work, along with Midrashic ( exegetic) texts. After usually opposing the priestly tradition with its exclusive focus on the written tradition and the Temple-related sacrificial cult, rabbinic Judaism reached the end of its formative period, offering a synthesis of a triad of traditions - the interpretive, messianic, and priestly. In medieval times, rabbinic Judaism continued to flourish in the diaspora, nowadays representing normative Judaism.

==== Hillel and Shammai ====
In the later part of the Second Temple period (2nd century BCE), the Second Commonwealth of Judea (Hasmonean Kingdom) was established, and religious matters were determined by a pair (zugot) which led the Sanhedrin. The Hasmonean Kingdom ended in 37 BCE, but it is believed that the "two-man rule of the Sanhedrin" lasted until the early part of the 1st century CE during the period of the Roman province of Judea. The last pair, Hillel and Shammai, was the most influential of the Sanhedrin zugot. Both were Pharisees, but the Sadducees were actually the dominant party while the Temple stood. Since the Sadducees did not survive the First Jewish–Roman War, their version of events has perished. In addition, Rabbinic Judaism sees Hillel's views as superior to Shammai's. The development of an oral tradition of teaching called the tanna would be the means by which the faith of Judaism would sustain the fall of the Second Temple.

==== Jewish messianism ====
Jewish messianism has its roots in the apocalyptic literature of the 2nd to 1st centuries BCE, promising a future "anointed" leader, or Messiah, to resurrect the Israelite "Kingdom of God" in place of the foreign rulers of the time. This corresponded with the Maccabean Revolt directed against the Seleucids. Following the fall of the Hasmonean kingdom, it was directed against the Roman administration of Iudaea Province, which, according to Josephus, began with the formation of the Zealots during the Census of Quirinius of 6 CE, although full-scale open revolt did not occur until the First Jewish–Roman War in 66 CE. Historian H. H. Ben-Sasson has proposed that the "Crisis under Caligula" (37–41) was the "first open break" between Rome and the Jews even though tension already existed during the census in 6 CE and under Sejanus (before 31 CE).

== Emergence of Rabbinic Judaism ==
=== Written and Oral Law ===
While the Torah represents the written law, Rabbinic tradition holds that its details and interpretation, which are called the Oral Torah or Oral Law, were originally an unwritten tradition based upon the Law given to Moses on Mount Sinai.

However, as the persecutions of the Jews increased and the details were in danger of being forgotten, these oral laws were recorded by rabbi Judah ha-Nasi ("Judah the Prince") in the Mishnah, redacted c. 200 CE. The Talmud was a compilation of both the Mishnah and the Gemara, rabbinic commentaries redacted over the next three centuries. The Gemara originated in two major centers of Jewish scholarship, Syria Palaestina and Babylonia. Correspondingly, two bodies of analysis developed, and two works of Talmud were created. The older compilation is called the Jerusalem Talmud. It was compiled sometime during the 4th century in Syria Palaestina.

Judaism at the time of the late Second Temple period was divided into antagonistic factions. The main camps were the Pharisees, Saducees, and Zealots, but also included other less influential sects. This led to further unrest, and the 1st century BCE and 1st century CE saw a number of charismatic religious leaders, contributing to what would become the Mishnah of Rabbinic Judaism, including Yochanan ben Zakai and Hanina Ben Dosa.

=== Destruction of the Temple ===
Following the destruction of the Temple in 70 CE and the expulsion of the Jews from the Roman province of Judea, Jewish worship stopped being centrally organized around the Temple, prayer took the place of sacrifice, and worship was rebuilt around rabbis who acted as teachers and leaders of individual communities.

The destruction of the Second Temple was a profoundly traumatic experience for the Jews, who were now confronted with difficult and far-reaching questions:

- How to achieve atonement without the Temple?
- How to explain the disastrous outcome of the rebellion?
- How to live in the post-Temple, Romanized world?
- How to connect present and past traditions?

How people answered these questions depended largely on their position prior to the revolt. But the destruction of the Second Temple by the Romans not only put an end to the revolt, it marked the end of an era. Revolutionaries like the Zealots had been crushed by the Romans, and had little credibility (the last Zealots died at Masada in 73). The Sadducees, whose teachings were so closely connected to the Temple cult, disappeared. The Essenes also vanished (or developed into Christians), perhaps because their teachings so diverged from the issues of the times that the destruction of the Second Temple was of no consequence to them; precisely for this reason, they were of little consequence to the vast majority of Jews.

Two organized groups remained: the Early Christians, and Pharisees. Some scholars, such as Daniel Boyarin and Paula Fredricksen, suggest that it was at this time, when Christians and Pharisees were competing for leadership of the Jewish people, that accounts of debates between Jesus and the apostles, debates with Pharisees, and anti-Pharisaic passages, were written and incorporated into the New Testament.

Of all the major Second Temple sects, only the Pharisees remained. Their vision of Jewish law as a means by which ordinary people could engage with the sacred in their daily lives, provided them with a position from which to respond to all four challenges, in a way meaningful to the vast majority of Jews.

Following the destruction of the Temple, Rome governed Judea through a Procurator at Caesarea and a Jewish Patriarch. A former leading Pharisee, Yohanan ben Zakkai, was appointed the first Patriarch (the Hebrew word, Nasi, also means prince, or president), and he reestablished the Sanhedrin at Javneh under Pharisee control. Instead of giving tithes to the priests and sacrificing offerings at the Temple, the rabbis instructed Jews to give money to charities and study in local synagogues, as well as to pay the Fiscus Iudaicus.

In 132, the Emperor Hadrian threatened to rebuild Jerusalem as a pagan city dedicated to Jupiter, called Aelia Capitolina. Some of the leading sages of the Sanhedrin supported a rebellion (and, for a short time, an independent state) led by Simon bar Kozeba (also called Simon bar Kokhba, or "son of a star"); some, such as Rabbi Akiva, believed Bar Kokhba to be a messiah. Up until this time, a number of Christians were still part of the Jewish community. However, they did not support or take part in the revolt. Whether because they had no wish to fight, or because they could not support a second messiah in addition to Jesus, or because of their harsh treatment by Bar Kokhba during his brief reign, these Christians also left the Jewish community around this time.

This revolt ended in 135 when Bar Kokhba and his army were defeated. The Romans then barred Jews from Jerusalem, until Constantine allowed Jews to enter for one day each year, during the holiday of Tisha B'Av.

After the suppression of the revolt the vast majority of Jews were sent into exile; shortly thereafter (around 200), Judah haNasi edited together judgments and traditions into an authoritative code, the Mishnah. This marks the transformation of Pharisaic Judaism into Rabbinic Judaism.

Although the rabbis traced their origins to the Pharisees, Rabbinic Judaism nevertheless involved a radical repudiation of certain elements of Pharisaism, elements that were basic to Second Temple Judaism. The Pharisees had been partisan. Members of different sects argued with one another over the correctness of their respective interpretations. After the destruction of the Second Temple, these sectarian divisions ended. The term Pharisee was no longer used, perhaps because it was a term more often used by non-Pharisees, but also because the term was explicitly sectarian. The rabbis claimed leadership over all Jews, and added to the Amidah the birkat haMinim, a prayer which in part exclaims, "Praised are You O Lord, who breaks enemies and defeats the arrogant", and which is understood as a rejection of sectarians and sectarianism. This shift by no means resolved conflicts over the interpretation of the Torah; rather, it relocated debates between sects to debates within Rabbinic Judaism.

The survival of Pharisaic or Rabbinic Judaism is attributed to Rabbi Yohanan ben Zakkai, the founder of the Yeshiva (religious school) in Yavne. Yavneh replaced Jerusalem as the new seat of a reconstituted Sanhedrin, which reestablished its authority and became a means of reuniting Jewry.

The destruction of the Second Temple brought about a dramatic change in Judaism. Rabbinic Judaism built upon Jewish tradition while adjusting to new realities. Temple ritual was replaced with prayer service in synagogues which built upon practices of Jews in the diaspora dating back to the Babylonian exile.

As the rabbis were required to face two shattering new realities, Judaism without a Temple (to serve as the center of teaching and study) and Judea without autonomy, there was a flurry of legal discourse and the old system of oral scholarship could not be maintained. It is during this period that rabbinic discourse began to be recorded in writing. The theory that the destruction of the Temple and subsequent upheaval led to the committing of Oral Law into writing was first explained in the Epistle of Sherira Gaon and often repeated.

The Oral Law was subsequently codified in the Mishnah and Gemarah, and is interpreted in rabbinic literature detailing subsequent rabbinic decisions and writings. Rabbinic Jewish literature is predicated on the belief that the Written Law cannot be properly understood without recourse to the Oral Law (the Mishnah).

Much rabbinic Jewish literature concerns specifying what behavior is sanctioned by the law; this body of interpretations is called halakha (the way).

The Talmud contains discussions and opinions regarding details of many oral laws believed to have originally been transmitted to Moses. Some see Exodus 18 and Numbers 11 as a display of Moses' appointing elders as judges to govern with him and judge disputes, imparting to them details and guidance of how to interpret the laws of God while carrying out their duties. The Oral Torah includes rules intended to prevent violations of the laws of the Torah and Talmud, sometimes referred to as "a fence around the Torah". For example, the written Torah prohibits certain types of travelling on the Sabbath; consequently, the Oral Torah prohibits walking great distances on the Sabbath to ensure that one does not accidentally engage in a type of travelling prohibited by the written Torah. Similarly, the written Torah prohibits plowing on the Sabbath; the Oral Torah prohibits carrying a stick on the Sabbath to ensure that one does not drag the stick and accidentally engage in prohibited plowing.

== Rabbinic literature ==
As the rabbis were required to face a new reality, that of Judaism without a Temple (to serve as the location for sacrifice and study) and Judea without autonomy, there was a flurry of legal discourse, and the old system of oral scholarship could not be maintained. It is during this period that rabbinic discourse began to be recorded in writing. The theory that the destruction of the Temple and subsequent upheaval led to the committing of Oral Torah into writing was first explained in the Epistle of Sherira Gaon and often repeated.

The Oral Torah was subsequently codified in the Mishnah and Gemara, and is interpreted in rabbinic literature detailing subsequent rabbinic decisions and writings. Rabbinic Jewish literature is predicated on the belief that the Torah cannot be properly understood without recourse to the Oral Torah. It states that many commandments and stipulations contained in the Written Torah would be difficult, if not impossible, to keep without the Oral Torah to define them. For example, the prohibition to do any "creative work" (melakha) on the Sabbath, which is given no definition in the Torah, is given a practical meaning in the Oral Torah, which provides definition of what constitutes melakha. Numerous examples exist of this general prohibitive language in the Torah (such as, "don't steal", without defining what is considered theft, or ownership and property laws), requiring—according to rabbinic thought—a subsequent definition through the Oral Torah. Thus Rabbinic Judaism claims that almost all directives, both positive and negative, in the Torah are non-specific in nature and require the existence of either an Oral Torah or some other method to explain them.

Much rabbinic Jewish literature concerns specifying what behavior is sanctioned by the law; this body of interpretations is called halakha (the way).

=== Talmud ===
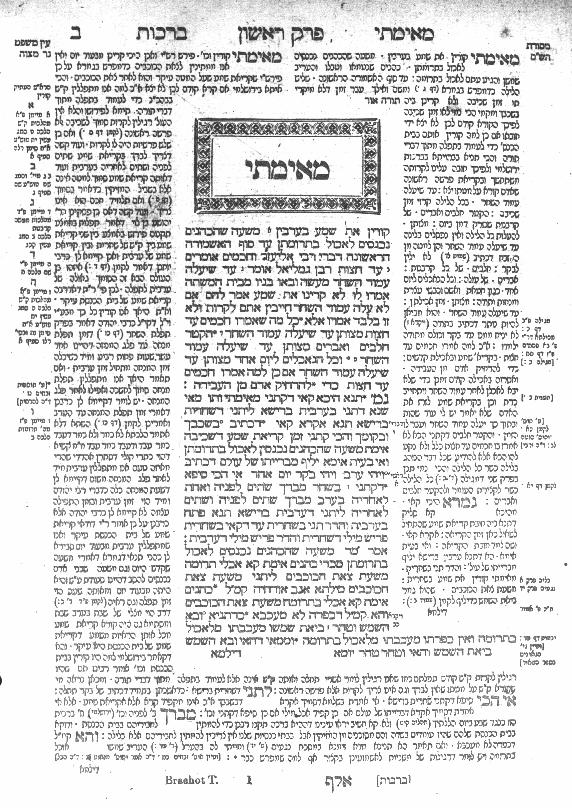
The first page of the Vilna Edition of the Babylonian Talmud, Tractate Berachot, folio 2a

Originally, Jewish scholarship was oral. Rabbis expounded and debated the law (the written law expressed in the Hebrew Bible) and discussed the Tanakh without the benefit of written works (other than the biblical books themselves), though some may have made private notes (megillot setarim), for example of court decisions. This situation changed drastically, however, mainly as the result of the destruction of the Jewish commonwealth in the year 70 CE and the consequent upheaval of Jewish social and legal norms. As the rabbis were required to face a new reality—mainly Judaism without a Temple (to serve as the center of teaching and study) and Judea without autonomy—there was a flurry of legal discourse and the old system of oral scholarship could not be maintained. It is during this period that rabbinic discourse began to be recorded in writing.

The earliest recorded oral law may have been of the midrashic form, in which halakhic discussion is structured as exegetical commentary on the Pentateuch (Torah). But an alternative form, organized by subject matter instead of by biblical verse, became dominant about the year 200 CE, when Rabbi Judah haNasi redacted the Mishnah (משנה).

The Oral Law was far from monolithic; rather, it varied among various schools. The most famous two were the School of Shammai and the School of Hillel. In general, all valid opinions, even the non-normative ones, were recorded in the Talmud.

The Talmud has two components: the Mishnah (c. 200 CE), the first written compendium of Judaism's Oral Law; and the Gemara (c. 500 CE), a discussion of the Mishnah and related Tannaitic writings that often ventures onto other subjects and expounds broadly on the Tanakh.

The rabbis of the Mishnah are known as Tannaim (sing. Tanna תנא). The rabbis of the Gemara are referred to as Amoraim (sing. Amora אמורא).

=== Mishnah ===
The Mishnah does not claim to be the development of new laws, but merely the collection of existing oral laws, traditions and traditional wisdom. The rabbis who contributed to the Mishnah are known as the Tannaim, of whom approximately 120 are known. The period during which the Mishnah was assembled spanned about 130 years, and five generations.

Most of the Mishnah is related without attribution (stam). This usually indicates that many sages taught so, or that Judah haNasi who redacted the Mishnah together with his academy/court ruled so. The halakhic ruling usually follows that view. Sometimes, however, it appears to be the opinion of a single sage, and the view of the sages collectively (Hebrew: חכמים, hachamim) is given separately.

The Talmud records a tradition that unattributed statements of the law represent the views of Rabbi Meir (Sanhedrin 86a), which supports the theory (recorded by Rav Sherira Gaon in his famous Iggeret) that he was the author of an earlier collection. For this reason, the few passages that actually say "this is the view of Rabbi Meir" represent cases where the author intended to present Rabbi Meir's view as a "minority opinion" not representing the accepted law.

Judah haNasi is credited with publishing the Mishnah, although there have been a few edits since his time (for example, those passages that cite him or his grandson, Rabbi Yehuda Nesi'ah; in addition, the Mishnah at the end of Tractate Sotah refers to the period after Judah haNasi's death, which could not have been written by Judah haNasi himself). According to the Iggeret of Sherira Gaon, after the tremendous upheaval caused by the destruction of the Temple and the Bar Kokhba revolt, the Oral Torah was in danger of being forgotten. It was for this reason that Judah haNasi chose to redact the Mishnah.

In addition to redacting the Mishnah, Judah haNasi and his court also ruled on which opinions should be followed, although the rulings do not always appear in the text.

As he went through the tractates, the Mishnah was set forth, but throughout his life some parts were updated as new information came to light. Because of the proliferation of earlier versions, it was deemed too hard to retract anything already released, and therefore a second version of certain laws were released. The Talmud refers to these differing versions as Mishnah Rishonah ("First Mishnah") and Mishnah Acharonah ("Last Mishnah"). David Zvi Hoffmann suggests that Mishnah Rishonah actually refers to texts from earlier sages upon which Judah haNasi based his Mishnah.

One theory is that the present Mishnah was based on an earlier collection by Rabbi Meir. There are also references to the "Mishnah of Rabbi Akiva", although this may simply mean his teachings in general. It is possible that Rabbi Akiva and Rabbi Meir established the divisions and order of subjects in the Mishnah, but this would make them the authors of a school curriculum rather than of a book.

Authorities are divided on whether Judah haNasi recorded the Mishnah in writing or established it as an oral text for memorisation. The most important early account of its composition, the Iggeret of Rabbi Sherira Gaon of Sherira Gaon, is ambiguous on the point, although the "Spanish" recension leans to the theory that the Mishnah was written.

=== Gemara ===
The Gemara is the part of the Talmud that contains rabbinical commentaries and analysis of the Mishnah. In the three centuries following the redaction of the Mishnah by Judah ha-Nasi (c. 200 CE), rabbis throughout Palestine and Babylonia analyzed, debated and discussed that work. These discussions form the Gemara (גמרא). Gemara means "completion" (from the Hebrew gamar גמר: "to complete") or "learning" (from the Aramaic: "to study"). The Gemara mainly focuses on elucidating and elaborating the opinions of the Tannaim. The rabbis of the Gemara are known as Amoraim (sing. Amora אמורא).

Much of the Gemara consists of legal analysis. The starting point for the analysis is usually a legal statement found in a Mishnah. The statement is then analyzed and compared with other statements used in different approaches to biblical exegesis in rabbinic Judaism (or—simpler—interpretation of text in Torah study) exchanges between two (frequently anonymous and sometimes metaphorical) disputants, termed the makshan (questioner) and tartzan (answerer). Another important function of Gemara is to identify the correct biblical basis for a given law presented in the Mishnah and the logical process connecting one with the other: this activity was known as talmud long before the existence of the Talmud as a text.

== Orthodox Jewish view ==
Orthodox Judaism sees itself as continuing organically from the religious and cultural heritage of the Israelites, stemming from the Law given to Moses at Sinai onwards. According to this view, while the title rabbi was not used earlier, Moses was the first rabbi (and is commonly referred to by Orthodox Jews as "Moses our Rabbi"), with the knowledge and laws received at Sinai being passed down from teachers to students through the era of the Judges, and the prophets (most of whom are seen as the "rabbis" of their time), through the sages of the late Second Temple period, and continuing until today.

== See also ==
- Synagogal Judaism, older and for a long time distinct from Rabbinic Judaism
- Jewish history
- Beth din
