= Samuel b. Abbahu =

Samuel b. Abbahu (Hebrew: רב שמואל בריה דרב אבהו, Rav Shmuel Beria DeRav Abbahu, or רב שמואל בר רבא, read as Rav Shmuel Bar Rabbah) was a Babylonian rabbi, of the eighth and last generation of amoraim, and the first generation of savoraim.

His colleague and "Bar-Plugata" opponent was R. Ahai, and they are recorded in the Babylonian Talmud on two halachic matters. He was the son of Rav Abbahu (not to be confused with Rabbi Abbahu), who was a sage of Pumbedita at the end of the amoraic era.
