= Yosei Alnaharvanai =

Yosei Alnaharvanai (Hebrew: יוסי אלנהרואנאי) was a Hebrew scholar of the Gaonic period, probably of Nehardea.

He is the author of a rhymed alphabetical treatise in Hebrew on the Hebrew calendar, printed in Kerem Ḥemed. This poem is interesting for the light it throws on the history of the Jewish calendar as well as on the history of medieval Hebrew poetry. A commentary on Alnaharvanai's verses was later written by Saadia ben Yehuda ben Evyatar in Egypt.
