= Hezekiah ben David =

Hezekiah Gaon or Hezekiah ben David (Hebrew: חזקיה בן דוד) was the last Gaon of the Talmudic academy in Pumbedita from 1038 to 1040.

Hezekiah ben David was a member of the House of Exilarchs; his father David was the son of Zakkai. Some scholars believe Hezekiah was great-grandson of David ben Zakai (not the grandson of David).

Hezekiah was elected to the office of principal after the death of Hai Gaon at the age of 99, but was denounced to a fanatical government of the Buyid dynasty, who then imprisoned and tortured him to death. However, the Jewish Quarterly Review mentioned that Hezekiah was liberated from prison, and became head of the academy, and is mentioned as such by a contemporary in 1046. With him ended his family except two sons who escaped to the Iberian Peninsula, where they found a home with Joseph ibn Naghrela, son of Samuel ibn Naghrillah.

The death of Hezekiah ended the line of the Geonim, which had begun four centuries earlier (see Hanan of Iskiya), and with it, Pumbedita Academy. The Spanish poet, Hiyya al-Daudi (d. 1154), ancestor of the Ibn Yahya family descended from David ben Hezekiah, who had escaped the Buyyids with his brother. In addition, Abraham bar Hiyya was said to be a descendant of Hezekiah.

Preceded by Hai Gaon	Gaon of the Pumbedita Academy; 1038–1040	Office extinct
