= Dodai ben Nahman =

Babylonian scholar

Dodai ben Nahman (Hebrew : דודאי בן נחמן or Rav Dorai, Hebrew: רב דוראי) was a Babylonian-Jewish scholar of the 8th century and gaon of the Talmudic academy at Pumbedita (761–764). Little is known of his life. He was a brother of the famed Judah ben Nahman, gaon at Sura (759–762), and with him was instrumental in preventing the eventual founder of Karaism, Anan ben David from succeeding to the exilarchate made vacant by the death of Solomon ben Hasdai and Isaac Iskoy ben Solomon, Anan's kinsmen.

| Preceded by R. Hananya ben R. Mesharsheya | Gaon of the Pumbedita Academy; 761-767 | Succeeded by Malka ben R. Aha |
