= Dosa ben Saadia =

Talmudic scholar and philosopher

Dosa ben Saadia (Hebrew: דּוֹסָא בֶּן סַעֲדְיָה, romanized: Dosā ben Saʿăḏyā; Arabic: دوسة بن سعيد الفيومي, romanized: Dawsa bin Saʻīd al-Fayyūmi; c. 935 – 1018) was a Talmudic scholar and philosopher who was the Gaon of Sura from 1012 until his death in 1018.

== Biography ==
Born in Tiberias in about 935, ancient Israel (then the Abbasid province of Bilad Al-Sham). His father Saadia Gaon was a prominent figure, the Sura Gaon from 928 to 942. In a letter written in 928, his father mentions his older brother Sheerit, although he does not mention Dosa. This has led scholars to place Dosa's birth around 935, meaning that he was only a young boy when his father died in 942. In 953, Sheerit and Dosa compiled a list of their father's books. Ibn Daud states in Sefer ha-Qabbalah that Dosa wrote a biography about his father entitled The Story of Rav Saadia and the Benefits He Did for Israel which was written in an epistle to Hasdai ibn Shaprut. Some state that Samuel ben Hofni was the last Sura Gaon, although in his commentaries Judah al-Madari includes Dosa in a list of the Sura Gaons. Dosa is also mentioned in the glossary of The Guide for the Perplexed by Maimonides, who states that Dosa was one of the scholars who combated the Greek conception of the eternity of the universe.

Most scholars have identified Dosa as being identical with David ben Saadia, who wrote several Talmudic work in Arabic. When Dosa was seventy-five, he became head of the Sura academy, following the death of Samuel ben Hofni in 1012. Only a few of Dosa's responsas survived, and the ones that did, reflect the modern Halakic stance that defined his father. Notably, Dosa defends Hai Gaon against Samuel Ibn Naghrella criticisms of Hai Gaon's talmudic interpretations. A more unusual aspect of his life, Dosa had taken an oath in his teenage years to refrain from eating bread as an act of asceticism, which he apparently continued until his death in 1018 in Baghdad.

Preceded by Samuel ben Hofni	Gaon of the Sura Academy; 1012–1018	Succeeded by Israel ha-Kohen ben Samuel ben Hofni
