= Aaron ibn Sargado =

10th century Babylonian gaon

- אהרן הכהן בן יוסף - כלף סרג'דו
- Title: Gaon

Personal life
- Parent: Joseph ha-Kohen (father)
- Era: 10th century
- Known for: Gaon of Pumbedita, Bible commentator

Religious life
- Religion: Judaism

Senior posting
- Predecessor: Hananiah

Aaron ibn Sargado or Aaron ben R. Joseph ha-Kohen (Hebrew: אהרן הכהן בן יוסף - כלף סרג'דו) was a tenth-century AD gaon (Jewish religious leader) in Pumbedita, Babylonia. He was a son of Joseph ha-Kohen.

== Biography ==
According to the chronicle of Sherira, Sargado was gaon from 943 to 960; others declare he died in 942. He was successor to the gaon Hananiah, the father of Sherira.

Rav Shrira continues to note that Rabbi Ahron HaKohen was not of a family of scholars, but of wealthy merchants; he was elevated to the gaonate (presidency of a rabbinical academy) through the influence of his family. Caleb ibn Sargado, the determined opponent of Saadia, who spent 60,000 zuzim in order to bring about the deposition of the gaon of Sura, was probably identical with Aaron, as Abraham Harkavy has shown.

== Rabbinic writings ==
Four of Sargado's legal decisions on religious problems are preserved, and are printed in the collection, "Ḥemdah Genuza," Nos. 37–40. One of these, it appears, was the answer to an inquiry from Kairouan.

Like his opponent Saadia Gaon, Aaron was a Bible commentator, and parts of his commentary are extant in St. Petersburg. Abraham ibn Ezra quotes some of his philosophical sayings.

Preceded by Hananiah ben Yehudai	Gaon of the Pumbedita Academy; 943-960	Succeeded by Nehemiah ben Kohen Tzedek
