= Surah (disambiguation) =

Surah may refer to:

- Sura or Surah, a division of the Qur'an
- Surah, an even-sided twill
- Sura (city), a city in ancient Babylonia
