= Ahai (disambiguation) =

Ahai was a Jewish sage, one of the Savoraim.

Ahai may also refer to:

- Ahha or Ahai, 5th century bishop of Seleucia-Ctesiphon
- Ahai or Achai Gaon, 8th century Jewish scholar and rabbi
- Ahai Dam, Yunnan, China
