= Simuna =

Jewish Savora sage

R. Simuna (or Semona, or Simona,Hebrew: רב סימונא, read as Rav Simuna; Alternative Hebrew spelling: רב סמוניה, רב סמונא, רב סימוניא, רב סמוניא) was a Jewish Savora sage of the second generation of the Savora era. He headed the Pumbedita Yeshiva simultaneously with Rav Ena running the Sura academy, and both committed the Talmud to writing. Some scholars identify him with Rav Giza (רב גיזא). Died in year 540 ( ד'ש'; Hebrew calendar).
