= Rabbah bar Nahmani =

Babylonian Jewish Talmudist

Rabbah bar Naḥmani (Jewish Babylonian Aramaic: רבה בר נחמני) (died c. 320) was a Jewish Talmudist known throughout the Talmud simply as Rabbah. He was a third-generation amora of the talmudic academies in Babylonia, which were in Asoristan, the Lower Mesopotamian part of the Sasanian Empire.

== Biography ==
Rabbah was a kohen descended from Eli the shofet. He was a student of Rav Huna at Sura Academy and of Judah bar Ezekiel at Pumbedita Academy. Huna seldom decided a question of importance without consulting him.

His brethren in the Talmudic academies in Syria Palaestina wrote to Rabbah to move to Palestine, where he would find a teacher in Johanan bar Nappaha; it would be far better for him to have a guide than to rely on himself in his studies. However, Rabbah never left Mesopotamia.

Upon the death of Judah bar Ezekiel, Rabbah succeeded as resh mthivtā (Jewish Babylonian Aramaic: ריש מתיבתא, romanized: rēsh mṯivtā; he held the post until his death 22 years later. He is also said to have lived in poverty, but little else is known about his private life. Residents of the city of Pumbedita hated Rabbah for his criticism of their practice of fraud according to tractate Shabbat 153a but loved by his students.

The academy achieved its height under his leadership, and he attracted many new students. He initiated the Kallah, biannual month-long study gatherings, leading to the students being absent at the time of tax collections. The Sasanian emperor sent bailiffs to seize him; he fled from city to city and finally into a marsh, where his body was found in a thicket. During the Kallah months, he is said to have attracted as many as 12,000 students.

According to Sherira ben Hanina, he was denounced to the emperor for causing twelve thousand men to be idle during the months of Elul in summer (קיטא qayṭā) and Adar in winter (סתוא saṯwā). The Talmud records that after his death, he was eulogized for seven days.

Rabbah's nephew was the great scholar Abaye (280–340), an orphan who he raised. He was succeeded by his son, who was also named Rabbah. Both Rabbah and Abaye were destined to die in the prime of their lives as they were descendants of Eli the Shofet, who was cursed that his descendants would die young. However, because Rabbah studied the Torah, he deserved to live to 40, whereas Abaye, who studied the Torah and performed extra acts of kindness, lived to the age of 60.

== Teaching ==
He was a scholar, known for his abilities to argue texts, resolve contradictions, and find applications, which gave him the nickname "uprooter of mountains".(עוקר הרים ʿoqer hārkm), He began his lectures with a joke or funny anecdote and would test his students by misstating principles and waiting for them to find the mistake.

Only about ten of Rabbah's aggadic teachings are recorded. He concentrated his attention on halakha, which he endeavored to elucidate by interpreting Mishnaic decisions and baraitot and by determining the fundamental reasons for the various Torah and rabbinical laws and explaining the apparent contradictions contained in them. He often asks: "Why did the Torah command this?" "Why did the sages forbid this?" He did not confine his interest to the practical laws of the Mishnah, however, like his teacher Judah bar Ezekiel. He studied all six orders of the Mishna according to tractate Ta'anit 24a,b and was the leading authority in the obscure subjects of nega'im and tumah and taharah.

He was not the author of Genesis Rabbah or the other midrashic works whose names end in "Rabbah." Genesis Rabbah is named after Hoshaiah Rabbah, and the others are named after Genesis Rabbah.

== Sources ==
- Encyclopaedia Judaica, 1972, Keter Publishing House, Jerusalem, Israel.
- Sefer Ha-Aggadah (Book of Legends), 1992, Schocken, New York.
