= Nehardea Academy =

Nehardea נהרדעא
- Nehardea's location inside Iraq
- Coordinates: 33°25′11″N 43°18′45″E
- Country: Iraq
- Governorate: Al Anbar

Nehardea Academy (Hebrew: ישיבת נהרדעא), previously also known as The House of Learning (Jewish Babylonian Aramaic: בי מדרשא, romanized: Bē Miḏraš) or The Boundary (Jewish Babylonian Aramaic: תחומא, romanized: Tḥūmā) was one of the major Talmudic academies in Babylonia (Mesopotamia), active intermittently from the early Amoraic period until the end of the Geonic period. It was established by the amora Samuel of Nehardea, one of the great sages of Babylon.

== History ==
Samuel founded the academy at Nehardea, which in time attracted thousands of students. Along with Sura Academy founded by Abba Arikha, it opened a new era in which Babylon became the center of Judaism. After Rav's death, many students from Sura moved to Nehardea.

Despite the fact that Rav Kahana III's Pum-Nahara Academy was subordinated to Sura Academy, from the time Rav died the heads of the Nehardea Academy came to visit Rav Kahana in Pum-Nahara with the intention of strengthening the ties between the two academies. This reinforcement of ties is attested by the fact that Kahana III gave his funeral oration to Rav Zevid of Nehardea at Pum-Nahara, a funeral oration, most probably in conjunction with the fact that Rav Kahana III was a disciple of Rav Zevid of Nehardea. R. Nahman of Nehardea visited Rav Kahana III in Pum-Nahara on the eve of Yom Kippur; it is possible he came in order to participate with them in the prayers of the holy day.

The academy had a special custom to show respect for the sages of The Land of Israel: When a guest came from the Land of Israel, he taught in the presence of the dean and all students. After the class ended, a long and lively debate was conducted in which the students would inundate the guest with academic questions.

Among the scholars who attended the Nehardea Academy, there were known Amoraim sages cited in the Talmud, such as R. Shimi of Nehardea, R. Dimi of Nehardea, Rav Zevid of Nehardea, and Amemar. In many Talmud citations, there is a mention of Nehardea's academy methods, however Amemar states that despite the fact that he is a Nehardean, he thinks otherwise. It is unclear whether he meant that Nehardea's academy thinks otherwise and not as what is known to be the methods, or was he an independent in his thinking.

After the death of Samuel, the academy split. The academy itself, headed by Rav Huna, a disciple of Samuel, moved to Sura, while another student of Rav and Shmuel, Judah ben Ezekiel, founded the Pumbedita Academy. However, Judah ben Ezekiel and his followers regarded Rav Huna as Gedol haDor, until upon his death in 297 (Hebrew calendar: ד"א נ"ח or ד'נ"ח ).

In some cases, where there is disagreement among scholars, the Nehardea academy practiced Rabbah bar Rav Huna'S view, and it may have to do with the fact that his son was the head of the academy and one of its leaders.

== See also ==
- History of the Jews in Iraq
- Talmudic academies in Syria Palaestina
