= Natronai ben Nehemiah =

Natronai ben Nehemiah (Hebrew: נטרונאי בן נחמיה; also called: Mar R. Yanka, Hebrew: בר מר ינקא) was Gaon of Pumbedita from 719 to 730; son-in-law of the exilarch Ḥasdai I. Vain of his family connections and secure in his position, he was so arrogant in his dealings with the students that many of them left the academy, returning only after his death.

Two responsa are ascribed to him, both relating to the return of Jews who had left their community to follow heretical leaders. In one of these responsa Natronai decides that the followers of the pseudo-Messiah Serenus, should again be received into their community; in the other he decides against the reception of the children of certain heretic Jews who had renounced both Talmudic and the Biblical Judaism.

A number of responsa in the compilation Sha'arei Tzedek and elsewhere bear the name of Natronai, but it is difficult to decide whether they are the work of Natronai b. Nehemiah or of some other Natronai. This difficulty tripped up, for instance, I.H. Weiss; who ascribed both responsa mentioned here to Naṭronai b. Hilai. As of the 1990s, consensus had that at least the responsum concerning Serenus was indeed that of Ben Nehemiah.

Preceded by Rav Rabya	Gaon of the Pumbedita Academy; 719	Succeeded by Judah Gaon
