= Naarmalcha =

River or canal in central Babylonia

Naarmalcha (Grecized form of the Aramaic Nahar Malkā, meaning the King's Canal or the Royal Canal; in Arabic: نهر الملك Nahr al-Malik) was a river or canal in central Babylonia that linked Euphrates and Tigris rivers. It corresponds to the older Royal River (Akkadian: nār šarri; Ancient Greek: Νααρσάρης Naarsárēs; Latin: Marses) in the Assyriological sources.

== See also ==
- Nehardea
- Julian's Persian War
