= Israel Moses Hazan =

Sephardic rabbi from Smyrna (1808–1862)

- ישראל משה חזן

Personal life
- Born: 1808 Smyrna, Ottoman Empire
- Died: October 1862 (aged 53–54) Beirut, Ottoman Empire
- Parent: Eliezer Hazan
- Notable works: Naḥalah le-Yisrael; Kontres Kedushat Yom-Tob Sheni; Dibre Shalom we-Emet; She'erit ha-Nahalah; Iyye ha-Yam; Kerakh shel Romi
- Known for: Commentary on the Responsa of the Geonim
- Occupation: Rabbi

Religious life
- Religion: Judaism

Israel Moses Hazan (1808 – October 1862) was a Sephardic rabbi from Smyrna.

== Life ==
He was taken by his father Eliezer Hazan to Jerusalem (1811), where he was educated under his grandfather, Joseph ben Hayyim Hazan. In 1840 he became a member of a rabbinical college; in 1848 he was appointed "meshullach" (messenger). While at Rome he was elected chief rabbi. In 1852 he resigned this office for the rabbinate of Corfu, and in 1857 he was called to the rabbinate of Alexandria. In 1862 he went to Jaffa; but, being in ill health, he removed to Beirut, where he died. He was buried in Sidon. In Rome and in Corfu he was held in high esteem, and the poet Ludwig August von Frankl, who saw him in Corfu (1856), speaks in glowing terms of his venerable personality. While a champion of Orthodoxy, he possessed sufficient independence of mind to protest against the superstitious practices customary among the Jews of Rome, who insisted on washing corpses with warm water, and who would not allow a clock in the yard of the synagogue. He wrote a letter condemning the reforms advocated in the Brunswick rabbinical conference (published in the collection "Kin'at Tziyyon," Amsterdam, 1846).

In his book Iyye ha-Yam, a commentary on the Responsa of the Geonim, he provided an extensive analysis of the Geonic chain of tradition, arguing among other things that the 'Spanish' version of Iggeret Sherira Gaon (Sherira Gaon's epistle) was the original version, in line with the scholarly consensus of the time.

=== Adaptation ===
Hazan's works were written entirely in Hebrew, and to be adapted for a vulgate audience, Crescenzo Alatri, a rabbi and scholar from Rome, translated a significant portion of his poetry into Italian.

== Works ==
- Naḥalah le-Yisrael, a collection of decisions in an inheritance case (Vienna, 1851; Alexandria, 1862); linked here
- Kontres Kedushat Yom-Tob Sheni, an argument in favor of retaining the second holy days (ib. 1855); linked here
- Dibre Shalom we-Emet, a reply (in the form of an address to the Israelites of Great Britain by a Levite) to a Reform pamphlet (Hebrew and English, London, 1856);
- She'erit ha-Nahalah, a discourse in dialogue on religious questions, with a revised edition of his Nahalah le-Yisrael (Alexandria, 1862);
- Iyye ha-Yam, responsa of the Geonim, with his notes (Livorno, 1864); linked here
- Kerakh shel Romi, responsa (ib. 1876); linked here.

Other responsa, with homilies and a defence of the Kabbalah, remain in manuscript.

== Jewish Encyclopedia bibliography ==
- Solomon Hazan, Ha-Ma'alot li-Shelomoh, p. 114;
- Elijah Hazan, Zikhron Yerushalayim, p. 131, Livorno, 1874;
- Berliner, Geschichte der Juden in Rom, pp. 152, 208, Frankfurt, 1893.
