= Talmudic academies in Babylonia =

Center for Jewish scholarship, 589 to 1038

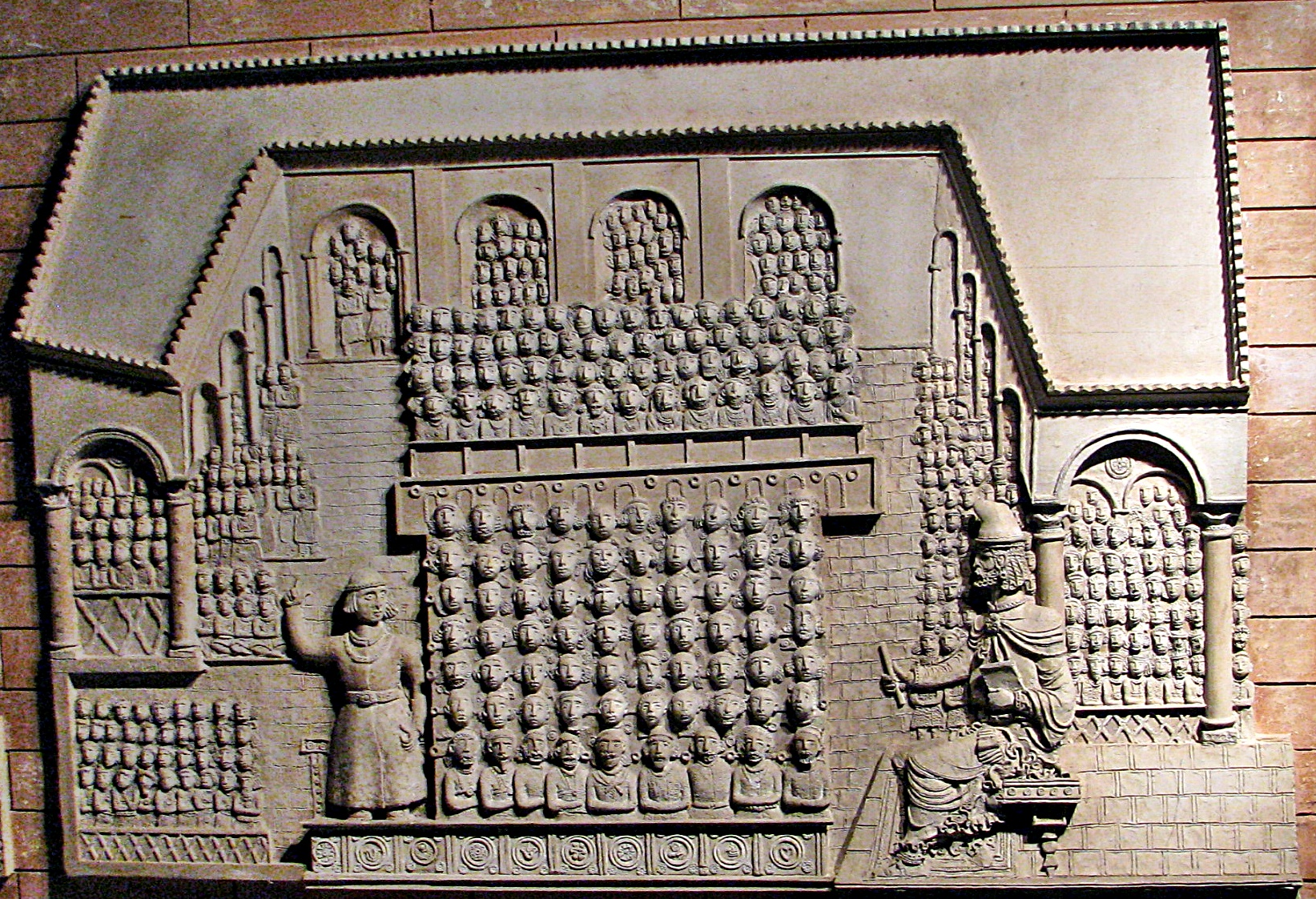
A depiction of Rabbi Ashi teaching at the Sura Academy

The Talmudic academies in Babylonia, also known as the Geonic academies, were the center for Jewish scholarship and the development of Halakha during the Geonic era (from c. 589 to 1038 CE; Hebrew dates: 4349 AM to 4798 AM) in what is called "Babylonia" in Jewish sources. This term is neither geopolitically nor geographically identical with the ancient empires of Babylonia, since the Jewish focus of interest has to do with the Jewish religious academies, which were mainly situated in an area between the rivers Tigris and Euphrates and primarily between Pumbedita (modern Fallujah, a town west of Baghdad), and Sura, a town farther south down the Euphrates. At the time this area was part of the region known as Asōristān (under the Sasanian Empire) or Iraq (under the Muslim caliphate until the 11th century).

The key work of these academies was the compilation of the Babylonian Talmud, started by Rav Ashi and Ravina, two leaders of the Babylonian Jewish community, around the year 550. Editorial work by the Savoraim or Rabbanan Savoraei (post-Talmudic rabbis), continued on this text for the next 250 years. In fact, much of the text did not reach its final form until around 700. The two most famous academies were located at Sura and Pumbedita; the Sura Academy was originally dominant, but its authority waned towards the end of the Geonic period and the Pumbedita Academy's Geonate gained ascendancy. Major yeshivot were also located at Nehardea and Mahuza (al-Mada'in).

For the Jews of late antiquity and the early Middle Ages, the yeshivot of Babylonia served much the same function as the ancient Sanhedrin, i.e., as a council of Jewish religious authorities. The academies were founded in pre-Islamic Babylonia under the Zoroastrian Sasanians and were located not far from the Sassanid capital of Ctesiphon, which at that time was the largest city in the world. After the Muslim conquest of Persia in the seventh century, the academies subsequently operated for four hundred years under the Islamic caliphate.

The first gaon of Sura, according to Sherira Gaon, was Mar Rab Mar, who assumed office in 609. The last gaon of Sura was Samuel ben Hofni, who died in 1034; the last gaon of Pumbedita was Hezekiah Gaon, who was tortured to death in 1040; hence, the activity of the Geonim covers a period of nearly 450 years. The Geonim (Hebrew: גאונים) were the presidents of the two great rabbinical colleges of Sura and Pumbedita, and were the generally accepted spiritual leaders of the worldwide Jewish community in the early Middle Ages, in contrast to the Resh Galuta (Exilarch) who wielded secular authority over the Jews in Islamic lands.

The three centuries in the course of which the Babylonian Talmud was developed in the academies founded by Rav and Samuel were followed by five centuries during which it was zealously preserved, studied, expounded in the schools, and, through their influence, recognized by the whole diaspora. Sura and Pumbedita were considered the only important seats of learning: their heads and sages were the undisputed authorities, whose decisions were sought from all sides and were accepted wherever Jewish communal life existed.

== Geographic area ==
Jewish sources regularly use the term "Babylonia" when referring to the location of the Talmudic academies in the northern half of Lower Mesopotamia during their activity from the second half of the 6th century to the first half of the 11th century (roughly the time of the Geonim). This region was known to contemporaries as the Sasanian province of Asōristān until the Muslim conquest in 637, after which it becomes known in Arabic as Sawad or al-'Irāq al-'Arabi ("Arabian Irāq").

The term "Babylonia" from Jewish sources has always been an anachronism, as the area they refer to is in no way identical with the by far more ancient empires of Babylonia. The Jewish sources only concentrate on the area between the two main academies, Pumbedita (modern Fallujah; west of Baghdad) in the north, and Sura in the south. Both academies, as well as Nehardea and Mahuza, are situated between, or in the immediate vicinity of, the rivers Tigris and Euphrates.

== History ==
=== Background ===
The history of the Jews in Babylonia is largely unknown for the four centuries covering the period from Ezra (c. 5th century BCE) to Hillel the Elder (traditionally c. 110 BCE – 10 CE); and the history of the succeeding two centuries, from Hillel to Judah the Prince (fl. 2nd century CE), furnishes only a few scanty items on the state of learning among the Babylonian Jews. In the chief source of information about the Babylonian schools, Sherira Gaon referred to those dark centuries in his famous letter: "No doubt, here in Babylonia public instruction was given in the Torah; but besides the exilarchs there were no recognized heads of schools until the death of Rabbi [Judah]."

The principal seat of Babylonian Judaism was Nehardea, where there were some institutions of learning. A very ancient synagogue, built, it was believed, by King Jeconiah, existed in Nehardea. At Huzal, near Nehardea, there was another synagogue, not far from which could be seen the ruins of Ezra's academy. In the period before Hadrian, Rabbi Akiva, on his arrival at Nehardea on a mission from the Sanhedrin, entered into a discussion with a resident scholar on a point of matrimonial law (Mishnah Yeb., end). At the same time there was at Nisibis, in northern Mesopotamia, an excellent Jewish college, at the head of which stood Judah ben Bathyra, and in which many Judean scholars found refuge at the time of the persecutions. A certain temporary importance was also attained by a school at Nehar-Peqod, founded by the Judean immigrant Haninah, nephew of Joshua ben Hananiah, which school could have become the cause of a schism between the Jews of Babylonia and those of Judea and Israel, had not the Judean authorities promptly checked Hananiah's ambition.

=== Founding of academies ===
Among those that helped to restore Jewish learning, after Hadrian, was the Babylonian scholar Nathan, a member of the family of the exilarch, who continued his activity even under Judah the Prince. Another Babylonian, Hiyya bar Abba, belonged to the foremost leaders in the closing age of the Tannaim. His nephew, Abba Arika, afterward called simply Rav, was one of the most important pupils of Judah. Rav's return to his Babylonian home, the year of which has been accurately recorded (530 Seleucid era, 219 CE), marks an epoch; for from it dates the beginning of a new movement in Babylonian Judaism—namely, the initiation of the dominant rôle which the Babylonian academies played for several centuries. Leaving Nehardea to his friend Samuel of Nehardea, whose father, Abba, was already reckoned among the authorities of that town, Rav founded a new academy in Sura, where he held property. Thus, there existed in Babylonia two contemporary academies, so far removed from each other, however, as not to interfere with each other's operations. Since Rav and Samuel were acknowledged peers in position and learning, their academies likewise were accounted of equal rank and influence. Thus both Babylonian rabbinical schools opened their lectures brilliantly, and the ensuing discussions in their classes furnished the earliest stratum of the scholarly material deposited in the Babylonian Talmud. The coexistence for many decades of these two colleges of equal rank originated that remarkable phenomenon of the dual leadership of the Babylonian academies which, with some slight interruptions, became a permanent institution and a weighty factor in the development of Babylonian Judaism.

When Odaenathus destroyed Nehardea in 259—twelve years after Rav's death, and five years after that of Samuel—its place was taken by a neighboring town, Pumbedita, where Judah bar Ezekiel, a pupil of both Rav and Samuel, founded a new school. During the life of its founder, and still more under his successors, this school acquired a reputation for intellectual keenness and discrimination, which often degenerated into mere hair-splitting. Pumbedita became the other focus of the intellectual life of Babylonian Israel, and retained that position until the end of the gaonic period.

Nehardea once more came into prominence under Amemar, a contemporary of Rav Ashi. The luster of Sura (also known by the name of its neighboring town, Mata Meḥasya) was enhanced by Rav's pupil and successor, Rav Huna, under whom the attendance at the academy reached unusual numbers. When Huna died, in 297, Judah ben Ezekiel, principal of the Pumbedita Academy, was recognized also by the sages of Sura as their head. On the death of Judah, two years later, Sura became the only center of learning, with Rav Chisda (died 309) as its head. Chisda had in Huna's lifetime rebuilt Rav's ruined academy in Sura, while Huna's college was in the vicinity of Mata Meḥasya (Sherira). On Chisda's death Sura lost its importance for a long time. In Pumbedita, Rabbah bar Nahmani (died 331), Joseph (died 333), and Abaye (died 339) taught in succession. They were followed by Raba, who transplanted the college to his native town, Mahuza (al-Mada'in). Under these masters the study of the Law attained a notable development, to which certain Judean-Israeli scholars, driven from their own homes by the persecutions of Roman tyranny, contributed no inconsiderable share.

After Raba's death, in 352, Pumbedita regained its former position. The head of the academy was Rav Nachman bar Yitzchak (died 356), a pupil of Raba. In his method of teaching may be discerned the first traces of an attempt to edit the enormous mass of material that ultimately formed the Babylonian Talmud. Not Pumbedita, however, but Sura, was destined to be the birthplace of this work. After Raba's death, Papa of Naresh, another of his pupils, founded a college in Naresh, near Sura, which, for the time being, interfered with the growth of the Sura school; but after Papa's death, in 375, the college at Sura regained its former supremacy. Its restorer was Rav Ashi, under whose guidance, during more than half a century (Ashi died 427), it attained great prominence, and presented such attractions that even the exilarchs came there, in the autumn of each year, to hold their customary official receptions. The school at Pumbedita recognized the preeminence of that of Sura; and this leadership was firmly retained for several centuries.

The unusual length of Ashi's activity, his undeniable high standing, his learning, as well as the favorable circumstances of the day, were all of potent influence in furthering the task he undertook; namely, that of sifting and collecting the material accumulated for two centuries by the Babylonian academies. The final editing of the literary work which this labour produced did not, it is true, take place until somewhat later; but tradition rightly names Ashi as the originator of the Babylonian Talmud. Indeed, Ashi's editorial work received many later additions and amplifications; but the form underwent no material modification. The Babylonian Talmud must be considered the work of the Academy of Sura, because Ashi submitted to each of the semiannual general assemblies of the academy, treatise by treatise, the results of his examination and selection, and invited discussion upon them. His work was continued and perfected, and probably reduced to writing, by succeeding heads of the Sura Academy, who preserved the fruit of his labors in those sad times of persecution which, shortly after his death, were the lot of the Jews of Babylonia. These misfortunes were undoubtedly the immediate cause of the publication of the Talmud as a complete work; and from the Academy of Sura was issued that unique literary effort which was destined to occupy such an extraordinary position in Judaism. Ravina II (R. Abina), a teacher in Sura, is considered by tradition the last amora; and the year of his death (812 of the Seleucidan, or 500 of the Common Era) is considered the date of the close of the Talmud. After his death the Jewish center moved to Pumbedita, where Raba Yossi was the head of the academy. Sura declined in this period as the Jews were persecuted. In Pumbedita the study continued and the academy became the leading one in Babylonia.

=== Exposition of Talmud ===
The three centuries in the course of which the Babylonian Talmud was developed in the academies founded by Rav and Samuel were followed by five centuries during which it was zealously preserved, studied, expounded in the schools, and, through their influence, recognized by the whole diaspora. Sura and Pumbedita were considered the only important seats of learning: their heads and sages were the undisputed authorities, whose decisions were sought from all sides and were accepted wherever Jewish communal life existed. In the words of the aggadah, "God created these two academies in order that the promise might be fulfilled, that the word of God should never depart from Israel's mouth" (Isaiah 59:21)." The periods of Jewish history immediately following the close of the Talmud are designated according to the titles of the teachers at Sura and Pumbedita; the time of the Geonim and that of the Savoraim. The Savoraim were the scholars whose diligent hands completed the Talmud in the first third of the sixth century, adding manifold amplifications to its text. The title "gaon," which originally belonged preeminently to the head of the Sura Academy, came into general use in the seventh century, under Muslim supremacy, when the official position and rank of the exilarchs and of the heads of the academy were regulated anew. But in order to leave no gaps between the bearers of the title, history must either continue the Savoraim into the seventh century or accept an older origin for the title of gaon. In point of fact, both titles are only conventionally and indifferently applied; the bearers of them are heads of either of the two academies of Sura and Pumbedita and, in that capacity, successors of the Amoraim.

The inherited higher standing of Sura endured until the end of the eighth century, after which Pumbedita came into greater importance. Sura will always occupy a prominent place in Jewish history; for it was there that Saadia Gaon gave a new impulse to Jewish lore, and thus paved the way for the intellectual regeneration of Judaism. Pumbedita, on the other hand, may boast that two of its teachers, Sherira and his son Hai Gaon (died 1038), terminated in most glorious fashion the age of the Geonim and with it the activities of the Babylonian academies.

When the Abbasid Caliphate and the city of Baghdad declined in the 10th century, many Babylonian Jews migrated to the Mediterranean region. The geonic academies declined and eventually closed, but the migrants helped Babylonian Jewish traditions become dominant throughout the Jewish world.

== Organization of the academies ==
Since the academies were convened in certain months of the year, they were known as metibta (Hebrew: מתיבתא), Aramaic for "session". Under the leadership of Rav and Shmuel, the Academy of Sura was still called a sidra. Under Rav Huna, the second dean of the Academy of Sura, the yeshiva began to be called a metibta and Huna was the first to bear the title of resh metibta (rosh mesivta, corresponding to rosh yeshiva). Resh metibta remained the official designation for the head of the academy until the end of the Geonic period.

== The Kallah (general assembly) ==
At the side of the rosh metibta, and second to him in rank, stood the rosh kallah (president of the general assembly). The kallah (general assembly) was a characteristic feature of Babylonian Judaism altogether unknown in Judea. Owing to the great extent of Babylonia, opportunities had to be furnished for those living far from the academies to take part in their deliberations. These meetings of outside students, at which of course the most varying ages and degrees of knowledge were represented, took place twice a year, in the months Adar and Elul. An account dating from the 10th century, describing the order of procedure and of the differences in rank at the kallah, contains details that refer only to the period of the Geonim; but much of it extends as far back as the time of the Amoraim. The description given in the following condensed rendering furnishes, at all events, a curious picture of the whole institution and of the inner life and organization of the Babylonian academies:

In the kallah-months, that is, in Elul, at the close of the summer, and in Adar, at the close of the winter, the disciples journey from their various abodes to the meeting, after having prepared in the previous five months the treatise announced at the close of the preceding kallah-month by the head of the academy. In Adar and Elul they present themselves before the head, who examines them upon this treatise. They sit in the following order of rank: Immediately next to the president is the first row, consisting of ten men; seven of these are rashe kallah; three of them are called 'ḥaberim' [associates]. Each of the seven rashe kallah has under him ten men called 'alufim' [masters]. The 70 allufim form the Sanhedrin, and are seated behind the above-mentioned first row, in seven rows, their faces being turned toward the president. Behind them are seated, without special locations, the remaining members of the academy and the assembled disciples. The examination proceeds in this wise: They that sit in the first row recite aloud the subject-matter, while the members of the remaining rows listen in silence. When they reach a passage that requires discussion they debate it among themselves, the head silently taking note of the subject of discussion. Then the head himself lectures upon the treatise under consideration, and adds an exposition of those passages that have given rise to discussion. Sometimes he addresses a question to those assembled as to how a certain Halakah is to be explained: this must be answered only by the scholar named by the head. The head adds his own exposition, and when everything has been made clear one of those in the first row arises and delivers an address, intended for the whole assembly, summing up the arguments on the theme they have been considering. … In the fourth week of the kallah-month the members of the Sanhedrin, as well as the other disciples, are examined individually by the head, to prove their knowledge and capacity. Whoever is shown to have insufficiently prepared himself is reproved by the head, and threatened with the withdrawal of the stipend appropriated for his subsistence. … The questions that have been received from various quarters are also discussed at these kallah assemblies for final solution. The head listens to the opinions of those present and formulates the decision, which is immediately written down. At the end of the month these collective answers (responsa) are read aloud to the assembly, and signed by the head.

== See also ==
- Rabbinic period
- History of the Jews in Iraq

=== Talmudic academies in Babylonia ===
- Firuz Shapur, modern-day Anbar, a town adjacent or identical to Nehardea; academy of Pumbedita was moved to this town for half of the 6th century
- Mahuza, modern-day Al-Mada'in; the academy of Pumbedita was relocated to Mahuza during the time of the Amora sage Rava
- Nehardea Academy (in Nehardea)
- Pumbedita Academy (in Pumbedita for most of its history, near modern-day Fallujah)
- Pum-Nahara Academy
- Sura Academy, in Sura – the political center of Jewish Babylonia after Nehardea

=== Talmudic academies in Syria Palaestina ===
- Talmudic Academies in Syria Palaestina (in the Land of Israel)
