= Samuel ben Hofni =

Gaon of Sura Academy in Mesopotamia

Rabbi Samuel ben Hofni
- שמואל בן חפני

Personal life
- Died: 1034
- Children: Israel ben Samuel Ha-Kohen

Religious life
- Religion: Judaism

Jewish leader
- Successor: Dosa ben Saadia
- Position: Gaon of Sura Academy
- Main work: Responsa, Introduction to the Talmud

Samuel ben Hofni (Hebrew: שמואל בן חפני; died 1034; abbreviation: Hebrew: הרשב״ח "The Rashbaḥ") was the gaon of Sura Academy in Mesopotamia ("Babylonia") from 998 to 1012.

== Biography ==
His father was a Talmudic scholar and Av Beit Din or chief jurist, probably of Fez), one of whose responsa are extant, and on whose death Samuel wrote an elegy. Samuel was the father-in-law of Hai ben Sherira, who is authority for the statement that Samuel, like many of his contemporaries, zealously pursued the study of non-Jewish literature. Beyond these few data, nothing is known of the events of Samuel's life. He served as the Gaon of Sura from 998 to 1012, he was later succeeded by Dosa ben Saadia. His son Israel ben Samuel Ha-Kohen was the last Sura Gaon.

== His responsa ==
Although, as a rule, geonic literature consists mainly of responsa, Samuel ben Ḥofni composed but few of these. This was because Sura Academy had for a century occupied a less prominent position than that of Pumbedita, and that, especially in the time of Hai ben Sherira, information was preferably sought at the latter institution.

A Cairo Genizah fragment of the Taylor-Schechter collection, containing a letter to Shemariah ben Elhanan written, according to Schechter's opinion, by Samuel ben Ḥofni, and another letter of Samuel's to Kairouan, show the great efforts which at this time the last representative of the Babylonian schools had to make to maintain the ancient seats of learning in Mesopotamia. Samuel's responsa, written in Hebrew, Aramaic, and Judeo-Arabic (those written in Arabic were translated into Hebrew) discuss tefillin, tzitzit, Shabbat and holidays, forbidden and permitted food (kashrut), women, priests, servants, property rights, and other questions of civil law. They consist chiefly of explanations of the Talmud and include some very short halakhic decisions, from which fact it is surmised that they are taken from his Talmud treatise Sha'arei Berakhot. With the intellectual independence peculiar to him, he occasionally declares a Talmudic law to be without Biblical foundation, and when an explanation in the Talmud seems inadequate, he adds one of his own which is satisfactory.

Samuel wrote the Introduction to the Talmud (Arabic: مدخل الى التلمود, romanized: Madḫal ile t-Talmūd), which is known only through citations from it made by Jonah ibn Janah, Joseph ben Judah ibn Aknin, and Abraham Zacuto. His treatise concerning the hermeneutic rules in the Talmud is known only by name. Some of Samuel ben Ḥofni's teachings, not found in any other sources, have been conveyed in Nathan ben Abraham I's Judeo-Arabic Mishnah commentary, supplemented by an anonymous copyist in the 12th-century. The entire work has been translated into Hebrew by Yosef Qafih.

== Treatises ==
Samuel's systematic treatises on many portions of the Talmudic law surpassed in number those of his predecessors. They were composed in Arabic, although some bore corresponding familiar Hebrew titles. They are:

- Aḥkām Shar‘ al-Ẓiẓit, ten chapters, on rules concerning tzitzit
- Lawāzim al-Aḥkām, known from a citation, from the catalogue of a book-dealer of the twelfth century (this catalogue was found among the genizah fragments of Fostat, and was published by E. N. Adler and I. Broydé, and from fragments recently (1906) discovered and published by Schechter
- Al-Bulūgh wa'l-Idrāk, in six chapters, on the attainment of one's majority (bar mitzvah)
- Fī al-Ṭalāq (appears in the above-mentioned catalogue under the title Kitāb al-Ṭalāq), on divorce
- Naskh al-Shar‘ wa-Uṣūl al-Dīn wa-Furū‘ihā (i.e., "Abrogation of the Law and the Foundations of Religion and Its Branches"), cited by Judah ibn Balaam and Moses ibn Ezra
- Fī al-Nafaqāt, concerning taxes
- Al-Shuf‘a, twenty chapters, concerning boundary disputes
- al-Risālah al-Shakīrīyah (= Hebrew, שכירות, mentioned by Moses ibn Ezra), probably concerning the hiring of persons
- Al-Sharā’i‘, concerning commandments; divided into "gates" or chapters ("she‘arim") with separate titles, e.g., Sha‘arei Sheḥiṭut; Sha‘ar shel Bediḳut haBasar min ha-Ḥelev; Sha‘arei Berakhot. The last-mentioned part has been edited in Hebrew by I. H. Weiss, and partially translated into German.
- Shurūṭ, concerning contracts
- Ha-Mattanah, concerning gifts
- Ha-Shuttafut, concerning partnership

The above-mentioned catalogue contains in addition the following titles of works by Samuel on the same subjects of Talmudic law:

- Kitāb Aḥkām al-Piqqadon, concerning deposits
- Kitāb al-Mujāwara, concerning neighborhood
- Kitāb al-Bay‘, concerning sales

The catalogue ascribes to Samuel ben Ḥofni likewise a commentary on the tractate Yebamot. Moreover, Schechter's genizah fragments contain the beginning of an Arabic commentary by Samuel on a Hebrew "reshut" of Saadia's.

== As Bible exegete ==
The most important work of Samuel, however, was in Bible exegesis. As early a writer as Jonah ibn Janah called him a leading advocate of simple, temperate explanation ("peshaṭ"), and Abraham ibn Ezra, although finding fault with his verbosity, placed him in the front rank of Bible commentators of the geonic period. In modern times his significance as a Bible exegete has been given proper appreciation through Harkavy's studies of the manuscripts in the St. Petersburg Library. Fragments of Samuel's commentary on the Pentateuch were preserved only in the Leningrad Ms. (St. Petersburg Ms.) and in Mss. from the Cairo Geniza, and which were collected, rendered into a Hebrew translation and published in 1979 by Aaron Greenbaum.

== Translations of the Bible ==
Samuel ben Ḥofni wrote, besides, an Arabic translation of the Pentateuch with a commentary, a commentary on some of the Prophets, and perhaps a commentary on Ecclesiastes. M. I. Israelsohn has published a portion of Samuel's Pentateuch translation (Gen. xli.-l.) with commentary. The deficiencies in these edited fragments might be supplied by the citations in Abraham Maimonides' commentary on Genesis and Exodus. The German translation of a specimen of these fragments is given in Winter and Wünsche.

The fragments show that Samuel's translation of the Pentateuch was dependent upon, though it was more literal than, that of Saadia, which had been written almost one hundred years earlier. In contrast to Saadia, Samuel gives Hebrew proper names in their original form. Grammatical notes occupy a remarkably small space in his verbose commentary, and his grammatical point of view was that taken by scholars before the time of Ḥayyuj. On the other hand, he gives careful consideration to the chronology of Bible accounts, and in explaining a word he gives all its various meanings besides references to its occurrence elsewhere. His source is the midrashic and Talmudic literature, though he specifically mentions only Seder Olam Rabbah and Targum Onkelos.

== Polemical writings ==
Samuel ben Ḥofni is mentioned in connection with Saadia and Muḳammaṣ as a polemical writer. An anti-Karaite work entitled Arayot, on the degrees of relationship, is ascribed to him, but whether correctly or incorrectly is not certain. Kabalists have assigned to him a Sefer ha-Yashar, and a request directed to Saadia for his decision on oaths.

== Theological views ==
Samuel ben Ḥofni is justly called a rationalist. In religious matters he considered reason higher than tradition. Holding to a belief in the creation of the world out of nothing, he rejected astrology and everything that reason denies. He deliberately placed himself in opposition to Saadia, who had held fast to the belief that the witch of En-dor had brought Samuel to life again, that the serpent had spoken to Eve, and the ass to Balaam, even though he felt himself compelled to explain the wonders by supplying the intermediary agency of angels. Samuel denied these and similar miracles, and, with an irony reminiscent of Ḥiwi al-Balkhi, he put the question, "Why, if they were able to do so at one time, do serpents not speak at present?"

According to his conception, God changes the natural order of things only when He wishes to verify before all people the words of a prophet. This view was opposed by his son-in-law Hai Gaon. That in later times he was not termed a heretic, although disparaging criticism was not lacking, was due to his position as gaon.

== Notes ==
Preceded by Zemah Tzedek ben Paltoi ben Isaac	Gaon of the Sura Academy; 998–1012	Succeeded by Dosa ben Saadia
