= Nehardea =

Nehardea נהרדעא
- Nehardea's location inside Iraq
- Coordinates: 33°25′11″N 43°18′45″E
- Country: Iraq
- Governorate: Al Anbar

Nehardea or Nehardeah (Imperial Aramaic: נהרדעא, romanized: nəhardəʿā "river of knowledge") was a city from the area called by ancient Jewish sources Babylonia, situated at or near the junction of the Euphrates with the Nahr Malka (the Royal Canal), one of the earliest and most prominent centers of Babylonian Judaism. It hosted the Nehardea Academy, one of the most prominent Talmudic academies in Babylonia, and was home to great scholars such as Samuel of Nehardea, Rav Nachman, and Amemar.

== Location ==
Nehardea was adjacent or identical to Anbar, a short distance from the modern city of Fallujah (formerly the site of Pumbedita).

== History ==
=== Before the amoraic period ===
As the seat of the exilarch, Nehardea traced its origin back to King Jehoiachin. According to Sherira Gaon, Jehoiachin and his coexilarchs built a synagogue at Nehardea, for the foundation of which they used earth and stones which they had brought (in accordance with the words of Psalms 102:15) from Jerusalem. For this reason it was called 'The Synagogue that Slid and Settled' ("Shaf we-Yatib") to which there are several references dating from the third and fourth centuries, and which Abaye asserts was the seat of the Shekhinah in Babylonia.

The priestly portion of the Jewish population of Nehardea was said to be descended from the slaves of Pashur ben Immer, the contemporary of King Jehoiachin. There are also other allusions in the Talmud casting doubt upon the purity of blood of the Nehardean Jews.

The fact that Hyrcanus II, the high priest, lived for a time in that city as a captive of the Parthians may explain the circumstance that as late as the third century certain of its inhabitants traced their descent back to the Hasmoneans. The importance of the city during the last century of the existence of the Second Temple appears from the following statement by Josephus:

The city of Nehardea is thickly populated, and among other advantages possesses an extensive and fertile territory. Moreover, it is impregnable, as it is surrounded by the Euphrates and is strongly fortified.

Reference to the extent of the territory of Nehardea is made in the Talmud also. In addition to the Euphrates, Nehar Malka (the King's Canal) formed one of the natural defenses of the city; the ferry over the river (or perhaps over the canal) is likewise mentioned. "Nehardea and Nisibis," says Josephus further (ib.), "were the treasuries of the Eastern Jews, for the Temple taxes were kept there until the stated days for forwarding them to Jerusalem." Nehardea was the native city of the two Jewish brothers Anilai and Asinai, who in the first third of the 1st century C.E. founded a semi-autonomous state on the Euphrates, under the Parthian government, and caused much trouble to the Babylonian Jews because of their marauder-like escapades. After the destruction of Jerusalem, Nehardea is first mentioned in connection with Rabbi Akiva's sojourn there. From the post-Hadrianic tannaitic period there is the anecdote referring to the debt which Aḥai ben Josiah had to collect at Nehardea.

=== Amoraic period ===
Nehardea emerges clearly into the light of history at the end of the tannaitic period. Rav Shela's school was then prominent, and served to pave the way for the activity of the Babylonian academies. Samuel of Nehardea (whose father, Abba ben Abba, was an authority in Nehardea) established the reputation of its academy, while Rav, who likewise taught there for a time, made Sura (situated on the Euphrates about twenty parasangs from Nehardea) the seat of an academy destined to achieve a still greater reputation. The history of Nehardea is summed up in that of Samuel's activity. Soon after Samuel's death, Nehardea was destroyed by Papa ben Neser (either another name for Odenathus, or one of his generals) in 259 CE, and its place as seat of the second academy was taken by Pumbedita.

Nehardea, however, soon regained its importance, for the eminent Rav Nachman dwelt there. There are several references to his activity. Rava tells of a walk which he took with Nachman through the "Shoemaker street," or, according to another version, through the "Scholars' street". Certain gates of Nehardea, which even in the time of Samuel were so far covered with earth that they could not be closed, were uncovered by Nachman. Two teachings in which Nachman designates Nehardea as "Babel" have been handed down. Sheshet also dwelt there temporarily. According to a teaching dating from the 4th century, an amora heard in Nehardea certain tannaitic teachings which had until then been unknown to scholars. Nehardea always remained the residence of a certain number of learned men, some of whom belonged to the school of Mahuza, which was of considerable prominence at that time, and some to that of Pumbedita. About the middle of the 4th century the famous scholar Ḥama was living at Nehardea; the maxim "By the 'amoraim of Nehardea' Ḥama is meant" became a canon in the Babylonian schools.

Toward the end of the 4th and at the beginning of the 5th century Nehardea again became a center of Babylonian Judaism through Amemar's activity, though this was overshadowed by that of Rav Ashi, the director of the Academy of Sura. It was Rav Ashi who had the seat of the exilarchate, which belonged as an ancient privilege to Nehardea, transferred to Sura. Amemar attempted in Nehardea to introduce the recitation of the Ten Commandments into the daily prayer ritual, but was dissuaded from doing so by Ashi. Another of Amemar's liturgical innovations is mentioned in Sukkot 55a (on the relation of Ashi to Amemar see Halevy, Dorot ha-Rishonim, ii. 515 et seq., iii. 68 et seq.).

Other scholars of the 4th and 5th centuries who are mentioned in the Talmud as natives of Nehardea include Dimi (who subsequently presided at Pumbedita as second successor to Ḥama), Zebid, Rav Nachman, Ḥanan and Simai. Adda b. Minyomi was called the "judge of Nehardea".

A few scattered data concerning Nehardea may be added. It was an ancient liturgical custom there to read pericopes from the Hagiographa on Shabbat afternoons. The surrounding country was said to be unsafe because of Bedouin robbers. An ancient rule of procedure of the court of Nehardea is mentioned in Ket. 87a. Lod in Palestine, and Nehardea are mentioned in the 3rd century as cities whose inhabitants were proud and ignorant. Nehardea is famous in the history of the Masorah because of an ancient tradition relating to the number of verses in the Bible; it is here said that Hamnuna brought this tradition from Nehardea, where he had received it from Naḳḳai. Certain readings of the Biblical text are characterized by tradition—especially by the Masorah to the Pentateuch Targum (Onkelos)—as being those of Sura, and certain others as of Nehardea.

=== Geonic period ===
Aḥa of Be-Ḥatim from the vicinity of Nehardea is mentioned by Sherira Gaon as one of the saboraic authorities of the 6th century. Mar R. Ḥanina is mentioned, among the earliest geonim of Pumbedita, as residing at Nehardea at the time of Muhammad. This is the last reference in Jewish history to Nehardea. Benjamin of Tudela, however, mentions the ruins of the synagogue Shaf-Yatib, two days' journey from Sura, and one and one-half from Pumbedita.

== Bibliography ==
- Barak S. Cohen, "‘In Nehardea Where There Are No Heretics’: The Purported Jewish Response to Christianity in Nehardea (A Re-examination of the Talmudic Evidence)," in Dan Jaffé (ed), Studies in Rabbinic Judaism and Early Christianity: Text and Context (Leiden: Brill, 2010) (Ancient Judaism and Early Christianity/Arbeiten zur Geschichte des antiken Judentums und des Urchristentums, 74)

== See also ==
- Talmudic academies in Babylonia
- Talmudic academies in Syria Palaestina
