= Ibn Yahya =

ibn Yahya (or ibn Yachya) may refer to:

- David ibn Yaḥya ben Solomon (1455-1528) rabbi of Lisbon, author of the "Leshon Limmudim"
- Gedaliah ibn Yahya ben Joseph (c. 1515 – c. 1587), Italian-Jewish talmudist
- Yosef ibn Yachya, Bible commentator, best known for his work on the Five Megillot

or

- Yahya ibn Yahya al-Laythi (died 848), a prominent Andalusian Muslim scholar
