= Nehemiah ben Kohen Tzedek =

Nehemiah ben Kohen Tzedek was the head (gaon) of the Academy of Pumbeditha from 960 to 968. Nehemiah was the son of Kohen Tzedek Kahana ben R. Joseph, who had been gaon.

While his predecessor, Aaron ibn Sargado, was still in office, Nehemiah tried to have him removed; but the college insisted on retaining him, as he was in every respect superior to his opponent.

After Sargado's death, Nehemiah finally succeeded in seizing the office by a trick, although the majority of the college, headed by the ab bet din, R. Sherira, refused to recognize him, and he was supported by only a few members and some wealthy laymen.

Nothing is known of his scholarly attainments or of his activity as gaon. Nehemah died in 968, and was succeeded as gaon by Sherira Gaon.

Preceded by Aaron ibn Sargado	Gaon of the Pumbedita Academy; 960-968	Succeeded by Sherira Gaon
