= Ahai =

Rabbi in the sevuraim era

R. Ahai (Hebrew: רב אחאי, read as Rav Achai; sometimes recorded as R. Aha, Hebrew: רב אחא, read as Rav Acha) was a Jewish Savora sage of the first generation of the Savora era. R. Ahai is the most recorded Savora sage in the Babylonian Talmud. His thorough questions in the Talmud are introduced with the phrase: "R. Ahai retorted:...". The sages of the Land of Israel said of him:

"Give heed to the opinion of R. Ahai for he enlightens the eyes of the exile."

As to his exact identification and period, there are number of hypotheses.

== Mentions in the Babylonian Talmud ==
Like the other sages of the Savora era, R. Ahai took part in the editing and redacting of the Babylonian Talmud. The edits made during this period include added explanations and comments as well as grammatical corrections, and were mostly done anonymously. R. Ahai is mentioned by name in the Talmud more than any other sage of the Savora era. Most of the time, he is explaining a difficulty presented in relation to a talmudic passage by sages of a previous generation. The questions he raises are preceded by the unique phrase "R. Ahai (or R. Aha) retorted". There is one instance in the Talmud of R. Ahai resolving a difficulty, with the introduction "R. Ahai explained". Twice, R. Ahai is mentioned together with his friend, Samuel b. Abbahu. Once, R. Ahai is mentioned disagreeing with Rabbah Jose, the head of the academy of Pumbedita.
