= Geonim =

Heads of the Babylonian Talmudic Academies (6th–11th century)

Geonim (Hebrew: גְאוֹנִים, lit. 'Excellencies', [ɡe(ʔ)oˈnim]; also transliterated as Gaonim; sing. Gaon, גָאוֹן, 'Excellency') were the chiefs of the Sura and Pumbedita Academies, the two great Talmudic Academies in Babylonia during the Abbasid Caliphate. They were generally accepted as the spiritual leaders of the Jewish community worldwide in the Early Middle Ages, in contrast to the Resh Galuta (Jewish Babylonian Aramaic: רֵישׁ גָּלוּתָא, lit. 'Head [of the] Exile') who wielded secular authority over the Jews in Islamic lands.

The title is derived from gei'on (גְאוֹן, 'pride' or 'majesty'), a Biblical Hebrew term found in Psalm 47:5, Nahum 2:3, Amos 6:8, and Amos 8:7, among other texts of the Hebrew Bible. In Modern Hebrew, the term (גאון) translates to "genius". The Geonim played a prominent and decisive role in the transmission and teaching of Torah and Halakha (Jewish law). They taught and studied Talmud and were decisors on halakhic matters regarding which no judgments had previously been rendered.

== Era ==
The period of the Geonim began in 589 CE (Hebrew date: 4349), after the period of the Sevora'im, and ended in 1038 (Hebrew date: 4798). The first gaon of Sura, according to Sherira Gaon, was Mar Rab Mar, who assumed office in 689. The last gaon of Sura was Samuel ben Ḥofni, who died in 1034 CE; the last gaon of Pumbedita was Hezekiah Gaon, who was tortured to death by zealots of the Buyid dynasty in 1040; hence the activity of the Geonim covers a period of nearly 450 years.

There were two major Babylonian Geonic academies, one in Sura and the other in Pumbedita. The Sura Academy was originally dominant, but its authority waned towards the end of the Geonic period and the Pumbedita Gaonate gained ascendancy (Louis Ginzberg in Geonica).

== Role in Jewish life ==
The Geonim officiated, in the last place, as directors of the academies, continuing as such the educational activity of the Amoraim and Saboraim. For while the Amoraim, through their interpretation of the Mishnah, gave rise to the Talmud, and while the Saboraim definitively edited it, the Geonim's task was to interpret it; for them it became the subject of study and instruction, and they gave religio-legal decisions in agreement with its teachings.

During the geonic period the Babylonian schools were the chief centers of Jewish learning; the Geonim, the heads of these schools, were recognized as the highest authorities in Jewish law. Even so, as late as 835–836, the Babylonian geonim still recognized the Palestinian Gaonate's greater authority in calendrical matters, by virtue of the latter's location in the Holy Land.

Despite the difficulties which hampered the irregular communications of the period, Jews who lived even in most distant countries sent their inquiries concerning religion and law to these officials in Babylonia. In the latter centuries of the geonic period, from the middle of the tenth to the middle of the eleventh, their supremacy lessened, as the study of the Talmud received care in other lands. The inhabitants of these regions gradually began to submit their questions to the heads of the schools in their own countries. Eventually they virtually ceased sending their questions to Babylonian Geonim.

== The title "Gaon" ==
The title gaon came to be applied to the heads of the two Babylonian academies of Sura and Pumbedita, although it did not displace the original title of Rosh Yeshivah Ge'on Ya'akov (Hebrew, head of the academy, pride of Jacob). The Aramaic term used was Resh metivta.

The title gaon properly designated the office of head of the academy. The title became popular in use around the end of the 6th century. As the academies of Sura and Pumbedita were invested with judicial authority, the gaon officiated as supreme judge.

The organization of the Babylonian academies recalled the ancient Sanhedrin. In many responsa of the Geonim, members of the schools are mentioned who belonged to the "great sanhedrin", and others who belonged to the "small sanhedrin". In front of the presiding gaon and facing him were seated seventy members of the academy in seven rows of ten persons each, each person in the seat assigned to him, and the whole forming, with the gaon, the so-called "great sanhedrin". Gaon Amram calls them in a responsum the "ordained scholars who take the place of the great sanhedrin". (A regular ordination ("semichah") is of course not implied here: that did not exist in Babylonia, only a solemn nomination taking place.)

Gaon Ẓemaḥ refers in a responsum to "the ancient scholars of the first row, who take the place of the great sanhedrin". The seven masters, or "allufim" and the "ḥaberim", the three most prominent among the other members of the college, sat in the first of the seven rows. Nine sanhedrists were subordinated to each of the seven allufim, who probably supervised the instruction given during the entire year by their subordinates. The members of the academy who were not ordained sat behind the seven rows of sanhedrists.

== Works of the Geonim ==
=== Responsa ===
Early in the Geonic era, the majority of the questions asked them were sent from Babylonia and the neighboring lands. Jewish communities in these regions had religious leaders who were somewhat acquainted with the Talmud, and who could on occasion visit the Jewish academies in Babylon. A literature of questions and answers developed, known as the responsa literature.

The questions were usually limited to one or more specific cases, while the responsum to such a query gave a ruling, a concise reason for it, together with supporting citations from the Talmud, and often a refutation of any possible objection.

More discursive were the responsa of the later geonim after the first half of the 9th century, when questions began to be sent from more distant regions, where the inhabitants were less familiar with the Talmud, and were less able to visit the Babylonian academies, then the only seats of Talmudic learning.

The later geonim did not restrict themselves to the Mishnah and Talmud, but used the decisions and responsa of their predecessors, whose sayings and traditions were generally regarded as authoritative. These responsa of the later geonim were often essays on Talmudic themes, and since a single letter often answered many questions, it frequently became book-length in size. Two important examples of such books are the Siddur of Amram Gaon, addressed to the Jews of Spain in response to a question about the laws of prayer, and the Epistle of Sherira Gaon, which sets out the history of the Mishnah and the Talmud in response to a question from Tunisia.

Some of the responsa that have survived are in their original form, while others are extant only as quotations in later works. Many have been found in the Cairo Genizah.

Examples of responsa collections are:

- Halakhot Pesukot min ha-Geonim (Brief Rulings of the Geonim): Constantinople 1516
- Sheelot u-Teshuvot me-ha-Geonim (Questions and Answers/Responses from the Geonim): Constantinople 1575
- Shaare Tzedek (Gates of Justice), edited by Nissim ben Hayyim: Salonica 1792, containing 533 responsa arranged according to subject and an index by the editor
- Teshuvot Ha-Geonim, ed. Mussafia: Lyck 1864
- Teshuvot ha-Geonim: Shaare Teshuvah with commentary Iyye ha-Yam by Israel Moses Hazan: Livorno 1869; linked here
- Shaare Teshuvah ha-Shalem, ed. Leiter: New York 1946
- Teshuvot Geone Mizrach u-Ma'arav, ed. Mueller: Berlin 1888
- Lewin, B. M., Otzar ha-Geonim: Thesaurus of the Gaonic Responsa and Commentaries Following the Order of the Talmudic Tractates (13 vols): Haifa 1928
- Assaf, Simhah, Teshuvot ha-Geonim: Jerusalem 1927 (second volume 1942).

=== Other works ===
Individual Geonim often composed treatises and commentaries. Three handbooks on Jewish law are:

- Halachot Pesukot of Yehudai Gaon (not to be confused with the responsa collection of the same name): this was the basis of many other abridgments
- She'iltot of Achai Gaon
- Halachot Gedolot, by Simeon Kayyara.

The most notable author among the Geonim was Saadia Gaon, who wrote Biblical commentaries and many other works: he is best known for the philosophical work Emunoth ve-Deoth.

== Yarchei Kallah ==
Two months of the year were denoted as yarchei kallah, or "months of the bride" (referring to the Talmud) – the Hebrew months of Adar and Elul. During this time, foreign students assembled in the academy for common study.

During the first three weeks of the yarchei kallah the scholars seated in the first row reported on the Talmud treatise assigned for study during the preceding months; in the fourth week the other scholars and also some of the pupils were called upon. Discussions followed, and difficult passages were laid before the gaon, who also took a prominent part in the debates, and freely reproved any member of the college who was not up to the standard of scholarship. At the end of the yarchei kallah the gaon designated the Talmudic treatise which the members of the assembly were obliged to study in the months intervening until the next gathering took place. The students who were not given seats were exempt from this task, being free to choose a subject for study according to their needs.

During the yarchei kallah, the gaon laid before the assembly a number of the questions that had been sent in during the year from all parts of the Diaspora. The requisite answers were discussed, and were finally recorded by the secretary of the academy according to the directions of the gaon. At the end of the yarchei kallah the questions, together with the answers, were read to the assembly, and the answers were signed by the gaon. A large number of the geonic responsa originated in this way; but many of them were written by the respective Geonim without consulting the kallah assemblies convened in the spring.

== Individual Geonim ==
- Achai Gaon (died c. 761)
- Amram Gaon (died 875)
- Dodai ben Nahman, gaon of the Talmudic academy at Pumbedita (761–764)
- Hai Gaon (939–1038)
- Saadia Gaon (882 or 892 – 942)
- Sherira Gaon (906–1006)

Chananel Ben Chushiel (Rabbeinu Chananel) (990–1053) and Nissim Gaon (990–1062) of Kairouan, though not holders of the office of Gaon, are often ranked among the Geonim. Others, perhaps more logically, consider them as constituting the first generation of Rishonim. Maimonides (1135–1204) sometimes uses the term "Geonim" in an extended sense, to mean "leading authorities", regardless of what country they lived in.

== See also ==
- History of Responsa: Geonim
- Rabbinic literature
