= Sura (city) =

Sura סורא
- Location in modern day Iraq
- Coordinates: 31°53′N 44°27′E
- Country: Iraq

Sura (Syriac: ܫܘܪܐ) was a city in the southern part of the area called by ancient Jewish sources Babylonia, located east of the Euphrates. It was well-known for its agricultural produce, which included grapes, wheat, and barley. It was also a major center of Torah scholarship and home of an important yeshiva—the Sura Academy—which, together with the yeshivas in Pumbedita and Nehardea, gave rise to the Babylonian Talmud.

== Location ==
According to Sherira Gaon, Sura (Imperial Aramaic: סורא) was identical to the town of Mata Mehasya, which is also mentioned in the Talmud, but Mata Mehasya is cited in the Talmud many times, either as a nearby town or a suburb of Sura, and the Talmudist academy in Mata Mehasya served as a branch of Sura Academy, which was founded by Abba Arikha in the third century.

A contemporary Syriac source describes it as a town completely inhabited by Jews, situated between Māḥōzē and al-Hirah in the Sawad. A responsum of Natronai ben Hilai says that Sura was about 6 kilometres (3.7 mi) from Harta D'Argiz, understood to be al-Hirah.

== See also ==
- History of the Jews in Iraq
- Talmudic Academies in Babylonia
  - Peroz-Shapur, now Anbar (town), a town adjacent or identical to Nehardea; academy of Pumbedita was moved to this town for half of the sixth century
  - Māḥōzē, modern-day al-Mada'in; the academy of Pumbedita was relocated to Māḥōzē during the time of the Amora Rava
  - Nehardea Academy (in Nehardea)
  - Pumbedita Academy (in Pumbedita for most of its history; near what is now Fallujah)
  - Pum-Nahara Academy
  - Sura Academy
- Talmudic Academies in Syria Palaestina
