= Savoraim =

Group of leading rabbis, c. 500–600 CE

Savora (Hebrew: [savoˈʁa]; Aramaic: סבורא, "a reasoner", plural Savora'im, Sabora'im [savoʁaˈ(ʔ)im], סבוראים) is a term used in Jewish law and history to signify one among the leading rabbis living from the end of period of the Amoraim (around 500 CE) to the beginning of the Geonim (around 600 CE). As a group they are also referred to as the Rabbeinu Sevorai or Rabanan Saborai, and may have played a large role in giving the Talmud its current structure. Modern scholars also use the plural term Stammaim (Hebrew; "closed, vague or unattributed sources") for the authors of unattributed statements in the Gemara.

== Role in the formation of the Talmud ==
Much of classical rabbinic literature generally holds that the Babylonian Talmud was redacted into more or less its final form around 550 CE. The Talmud states that Ravina and Rav Ashi (two amoraim) were the "end of instruction", which many understand to mean they compiled the Babylonian Talmud. Maimonides wrote that Ravina and Rav Ashi were the last generation of sages in the Talmud, and that it was Rav Ashi who composed the Babylonian Talmud.

However, some statements within classical rabbinic literature, and later analysis thereof, have led many scholars to conclude that the Babylonian Talmud was smoothed over by the Savora'im, although almost nothing was changed. There are statements in the Talmud itself referring to generations later than Ravina and Rav Ashi. Occasionally, multiple versions of the same legalistic discussion are included with minor variations. The text also states that various opinions emanated from various Talmudic academies.

Sherira Gaon (c. 987 CE) indicates that the Talmud was not in its final form until many generations after Ravina and Rav Ashi, and that Rav Yose was the final member of the Savora'im. Occasionally, specific Savora'im are mentioned by name in the Talmud itself, such as Rabbi Ahai, who (according to later authority Rashbam) was a Savora.

The first to suggest that the Savoraim were the redactors of the whole Babylonian Talmud was Julius Kaplan in his book The Redaction of the Babylonian Talmud (1933). He was soon followed by Hyman Klein.

David Weiss Halivni, a modern scholar, attempted to determine the authorship of anonymous portions of the Talmud. Halivni termed the editors of the Talmud as Stamma'im, a new term for rabbis that he placed after the period of the Tannaim and Amoraim, but before the Geonic period. He concluded that to a large extent, the Stamma'im essentially wrote the Gemara (the discussions in the Talmud about the Mishna). Halivni posited that during the time of Ravina and Rav Ashi, they compiled a Gemara that was much smaller than the Gemara known today, and which likely was similar to the Mishna and to the Tosefta. He sees this proto-Gemara as a compilation of rulings that probably had little record of discussions. Halivni also posits that the Stamma'im did not always fully understand the context and import of the statement of the Tanna or Amora when it was said. The methodology employed in his commentary, Mekorot u' Mesorot, attempts to give Halivni's analysis of the correct import and context and demonstrates how the Talmud erred in its understanding of the original context.

== See also ==
- Eras of history important in Jewish law
