= Pumbedita =

Babylonian city located somewhere in modern Iraq

Pumbedita (Note: Also Pumbeditha, Pumpedita, or Pumbedisa.) (Jewish Babylonian Aramaic: פוּם בְּדִיתָא Pūm Bəḏīṯāʾ, "Mouth of the Bedita") was an ancient city located in modern-day Iraq. It is known for having hosted the Pumbedita Academy.

== History ==
The city of Pumbedita was said to have possessed a Jewish population since the days of the Second Temple of Jerusalem.

Under Arab rule, from the seventh century, Pumbedita was known as Al-Anbar (“the granaries”).

== Pumbedita Academy ==
Pumbedita was the seat of the Pumbedita Academy, one of the major Talmudic academies of Babylonia. The academy was founded by Judah ben Ezekiel around 260 CE, after the destruction of the academy at Nehardea during the Persian–Palmyrian war.

Together with the academy at Sura, Pumbedita became one of the principal centers of rabbinic scholarship in Babylonia and played an important role in the tradition that produced the Babylonian Talmud.

== Location ==
The exact site of Pumbedita has not been securely identified. Several locations have been proposed on the basis of medieval geographical accounts, rabbinic sources, and later scholarship, but none has been confirmed by archaeological evidence.

Guy Le Strange, in his geography of Mesopotamia in the Abbasid era constructed from Ibn Serapion (ca. 900), cited a possible location for Pumbedita:

The Nahr-al-Badāt was a long drainage channel taken from the left bank of the Kūfah arm of the Euphrates, at a day's journey to the north of Kūfah city, probably near the town of Kanṭarah-al-Kūfah ... [which] probably lay adjacent to, or possibly was identical with, the Hebrew Pombedita.

However, this location is too far south and has been rejected by more recent scholarship. Sherira ben Hanina (tentative ascription) writes that in Arabic the Bedita is called al-Bedei'a. Some scholars have connected Pumbedita to Fallujah, but for no good reason.

The twelfth-century travel account of Benjamin of Tudela describes El-Anbar as Pumbedita in Nehardea and reports that about 3,000 Jews lived there:

Thence it is a day and a half's journey to El-Anbar, which was Pumbedita in Nehardea. About 3,000 Jews dwell there. The city lies on the river Euphrates. Here is the Synagogue of Rab and Samuel, and their house of study, and in front of it are their graves.

El-Anbar ("the granaries"; also rendered Al-Anbar) is mentioned by Ibn Serapion, and Strange identifies it with "the ruins named Sifeyra". According to William McGuckin de Slane, it lay ten parasangs to the west of Baghdad. However, Michael Jan de Goeje reads Al-Jubbar in place of Al-Anbar, and identifies it with Jubbah, Iraq, an identification already made by Jean-Baptiste d'Anville. William Francis Ainsworth reads Aliobar and relates to the also-obscure "Olabus" mentioned by Isidore of Charax.

== See also ==
- Talmudic academies in Babylonia
