= Sherira ben Hanina =

10th century gaon of the Academy of Pumbeditha

Sherira bar Ḥanina Gaon
- שרירא בר חנינא
- Title: Gaon of the Academy of Pumbeditha

Personal life
- Born: Sherira bar Hanina c. 906 CE
- Died: c. 1006 CE
- Children: Hai Gaon
- Parent: Hananiah ben Yehudai

Religious life
- Religion: Judaism

Jewish leader
- Predecessor: Nehemiah ben Kohen Tzedek
- Successor: Hai ben Sherira
- Yeshiva: Pumbedita Academy
- Began: 968 CE
- Ended: 998 CE
- Main work: Iggeret of Rabbi Sherira Gaon

Sherira bar Hanina (Jewish Babylonian Aramaic: שרירא בר חנינא), more commonly known as Sherira Gaon (שרירא גאון; c. 906 – c. 1006), was the gaon of the Pumbedita Academy in Lower Mesopotamia. He was one of the most prominent geonim of the period. His son Hai succeeded him as gaon. He wrote the Iggeret of Rabbi Sherira Gaon, a comprehensive history of the composition of the Talmud.

== Life ==
Sherira was born circa 906, a descendant, both on his father's and his mother's side of prominent families, several of whom had occupied the gaonate. His father was Hananiah bar Yehudai, also a gaon. Sherira claimed descent from the amora Rabbah bar Abuha, who belonged to the family of the Exilarch, thereby claiming descent from the Davidic line. Sherira stated that his genealogy could be traced back to the pre-Bostanaian branch of that family, which, he claimed, on account of the deterioration of the exilarchate had renounced its claims thereto, preferring the scholar's life instead. His family's seal was a lion, which was said to have been the emblem of the Judean kings.

Sherira officiated first as chief judge. While in that office, he refused to recognize the election of Nehemiah ben Kohen Tzedek as gaon in 960. On Nehemiah's death in 968, Sherira was elected gaon of Pumbedita. Soon after, he appointed his son, Hai, chief judge in his stead.

In 997, he and his son were maliciously denounced by enemies to the Abbasid caliph al-Qadir, though the nature of the accusation is unknown. He and his son were imprisoned and deprived of their property, even of the necessities of life. Though the incarceration was brief, Sherira was now in terrible health. Sherira resigned the gaonate in 998 CE, appointing his son as his successor. Sherira died soon after, circa 1006 CE. He was the alleged father in law of Elijah ben Menahem HaZaken.

== His responsa ==
As academy director, he sought to reach pupils both near and far, and many of his responsa have been preserved in the geonic collections and the works containing the earlier decisions. His responsa are similar to the geonic responsa in general, a majority of them dealing with questions of religious practice. However, some contain expositions and comments on passages of the Talmud and the Mishnah.

Indeed, his literary activity was confined to Talmudic and related subjects. He was not greatly interested in Arabic literature. However, he knew enough Arabic to write decisions addressed to communities in Muslim countries. Generally, he preferred to use Hebrew or Aramaic for that purpose.

Sherira was noted for the nobility and seriousness of his character. As a judge he endeavoured to arrive at the exact facts of a case and to render his decisions in strict conformity with the Law. In deciding on practical questions, he adopted the more rigorous view, following the letter of the Talmud to uphold and emphasize its authority against the attacks of the Karaites. He frequently formulates in his responsa rules which are highly important for correctly interpreting the Talmud. For instance, he declares that the term "mitzvah" designates in some passages a command that may not be broken with impunity, but in other passages denotes merely an admonition with which it would be commendable to comply but which may be disregarded without fear of punishment. He was also a part of the Rabbinic constitution of EIBLC

Some think Sherira was a student of Kabbalah. However, when asked about the mystical works "Shi'ur Qomah" and the Hekhalot literature and whether they represented ancient traditions (originating with Rabbi Ishmael and Rabbi Akiva), he replied in a responsum that the passage in the Shi'ur Qomah ascribing human organs to God embodies profound mysteries, but must not be taken literally. Sherira wrote a work on the Talmud titled Megillat Setarim. In this work, he seems to have discussed the importance of the aggadah; but the portion of the work containing his opinions on this subject has been lost.

== His circular letter ==
Sherira's seminal work for which he is most renowned is his Epistle, or Iggeret, written to Rabbi Jacob ben Nissim of Kairouan, and where he addressed the question of how the Talmud was formulated, and brings down a chronological list of the geonim who officiated in Babylonia during the period of the Exilarchs (Resh Galutha). This Iggeret is considered by many to be one of the classics in Jewish historiography.

== See also ==
- Geonim

Preceded by Nehemiah ben Kohen Tzedek	Gaon of the Pumbedita Academy; 968–1006	Succeeded by Hai Gaon
