= Dimi (rabbi) =

Dimi (also called Abdimi and Abudimi) is the name of several Amoraim, mostly of Babylonian origin.

== Dimi ==
Amora of the fourth century who often carried Palestinian doctrinal and exegetical remarks to the Babylonian schools, and Babylonian teachings to Palestine (see Abdima Naḥota). In consequence of a decree of banishment issued by Constantius II against the teachers of Judaism in Palestine, he finally settled in Babylonia. Dimi was a perfect storehouse of diversified knowledge, which he diligently gathered and as freely disseminated; and he made the transmission of the teachings of his most prominent Palestinian predecessors his special mission. He reported in the names of Jannai, Hanina, Joshua ben Levi, Shimon ben Lakish, Isaac, Eleazar, and, most frequently, R. Johanan; and almost as often he reported Palestinian observations with merely the introductory formula ("They say in the West").

Abaye was the most appreciative recipient of Dimi's information, which ranged along the lines of the halakhah and the aggadah, occasionally touching also physical geography, history, and ethics. When Abaye once inquired of him, "What do the Westerners [Palestinians] most strenuously avoid in their social intercourse?" Dimi replied, "Putting a neighbor to shame; for R. Ḥanina counts this sin among the three unpardonable ones". Dimi was also opposed to the bestowal of excessive praise, and thus illustrated the Biblical proverb (Proverbs 27:14), "He that blesses his friend with a loud voice, rising early in the morning, it shall be counted a curse to him."

Usually Dimi communicated his knowledge personally; but where circumstances required it, he did so by messages. Thus, when on one occasion, having himself reported in Pumbedita a halakhah as construed by R. Johanan, he discovered on his arrival at Nehardea that he had been mistaken, he sent word to the misinformed, candidly confessing, "What I have told you is founded on an error".

== Dimi ==
Babylonian scholar of the fourth century; brother of Rav Safra. According to the testimony of his contemporary, R. Abba, Dimi was not endowed with worldly goods, but was blessed with a clear conscience. In his last hours he was visited by his learned brother, to whom he remarked, "May it come home to me ("I deserve God's mercy") because I have observed all the rules prescribed by the Rabbis". When asked, "Did you also refrain from sounding your neighbor's praises, for in continually talking of one's virtues, a man incidentally refers to his vices?" he replied, "I have never heard of such a precept; and had I heard it, I should have followed it." Another version makes Dimi himself the transmitter of that very rule.

== Dimi of Ḥaifa ==
(Meg. 29b; compare "Sheiltot on Ḥanukkah," end): See Avdimi of Haifa.

== Dimi b. Ḥama ==
See Abdima Bar Ḥama.

== Dimi b. Hinena ==
Babylonian amora of the fourth century; contemporary of Rav Safra and of Hiyya bar Rabbah bar Nahmani; also of Rava, before whom he and his brother Rabbah (Rabbin) b. Hinena once appeared as litigants. That he was prominent among the scholars of his age may be assumed from the fact that Rav Chisda cites a halakhic decision of his.

== Dimi b. Huna of Damharia ==
Babylonian halakhist of the sixth amoraic generation (fifth century); contemporary of Rabbina III.

== Dimi b. Isaac ==
Babylonian amora of the fourth generation; junior of Rav Judah bar Ezekiel, who gave him some lessons in comparative anatomy. Introducing a lecture on the Book of Esther, Dimi cites Ezra 9:9, "Our God has not forsaken us in our bondage, but has extended mercy unto us in the sight of the kings of Persia." "When?" he asks; and answers, "In the days of Haman".

== Dimi bar Joseph ==
Babylonian scholar of the third amoraic generation (third century); disciple of Samuel of Nehardea and senior to Rav Chisda and Rav Sheshet.

His sister sued him before Rav Nachman for the restoration of a parcel of land which she had legally transferred to him in her illness. Probably because of Dimi's age and professional status, he refused to obey Nachman's summons until he was threatened with excommunication.

When his son had the misfortune to lose a child within thirty days from its birth, and—contrary to the rabbinic rule, which does not impose mourning for an infant under thirty days of age—he had assumed ritualistic mourning, Dimi remonstrated with him, observing, "It is only because you desire to be regaled with delicacies that you indulge in ritualistic mourning for so young an infant".

== Dimi b. Levai ==
Babylonian scholar of the fourth century. Once on a cloudy Friday, he thought that the sun had set, and at once recited the Sabbath prayer. Subsequently the skies cleared, and he discovered his mistake. Upon his seeking rabbinic guidance, Abaye declared that he could resume his weekday work.

== Dimi of Nehardea ==
Babylonian scholar of the fourth century; head of the Academy of Pumbedita (385-388). Prior to his elevation to the rectorate he was a produce-merchant; and the Talmud preserves an anecdote of that time which affords an insight into the economic laws of the age as well as an idea of Dimi's standing among the learned even in his youth. The law had provided that—except the dealer in spices or perfumes at any time, and the public generally while fairs were being held—no non-resident merchant might enter his wares in competition with local traders. A notable exception to this rule was the scholar. To him the market was always open; and to facilitate his sales and his return to study, the law gave him the rights of monopoly until he disposed of his goods. Now, Dimi once brought to Mahuza a shipload of dried figs, when Rava was requested by the exilarch "to tap Dimi's pitcher", i.e., to examine him ascertain whether he was a scholar and consequently entitled to the special market privileges. Rava deputed Adda bar Abba (Ahaba) to examine Dimi; and Adda propounded to the newcomer a supposititious ritual question. Dimi thought that his interlocutor was Rava himself, and deferentially inquired, "Is not my master Rava?" The other, familiarly tapping him on the sandal, replied, "Between me and Rava there is a great difference. At any rate, I am your superior, and Rava is your superior's superior." The privileges of the market were not granted to Dimi, and eventually the figs spoiled. He then applied to Rav Yosef for redress; and the latter, provoked at the discomfiture of the scholar, exclaimed, "He who has not failed to avenge the disgrace of the Edomite king will not fail to avenge your disgrace." It is added that shortly afterward Rab Adda died suddenly, and several rabbis, including Dimi, who had some grievances against him, reproached themselves with having been indirectly instrumental in his punishment.

As an educator Dimi acted on the maxim, "Rivalry among scholars advances scholarship"; therefore he approved Rava's rule not to remove a teacher because his rival makes better progress with his pupils, arguing that rivalry will induce more strenuous efforts and produce better results. On the other hand, Rava, believing that "mistakes will correct themselves," showed preference for the teacher that succeeded in imparting much knowledge, even if not very exact. Dimi opposed this with his maxim, "Where error has once crept in, it stays"; and he therefore looked for precision rather than for quantity.

He is only cited in the Talmud in connection with halakhah, while no aggadah appears in his name.

== Dimi b. Nehemiah (Nahman) b. Joseph ==
A Babylonian amora of uncertain age, only rarely cited in rabbinical literature. He is probably identical with Avdimi b. Nehuniah, by whom the Psalmist's effusion, "I will praise you; for I am fearfully and wonderfully made: marvelous are your works; and that my soul knows right well," is illustrated thus: "Some things are beneficial to the liver and deleterious to the windpipe; others are beneficial to the latter and deleterious to the former. There are ten organs in man: the windpipe [larynx] produces voice; the gullet conducts the food; the liver is the seat of anger; the lungs promote thirst; the gall, jealousy; the stomach, sleep; the first stomach grinds the food; the spleen promotes laughter; the kidneys counsel; and the heart decides. Therefore David glorifies, 'I will praise you..." Therefore, too, he elsewhere exhorts, 'Bless the Lord, O my soul: and all that is within me, bless his holy name'".
