= Rav Safra =

Rav Safra (Hebrew: רב ספרא; around 280-338) was a Babylonian rabbi, of the fourth generation of amoraim.

== Biography ==
Safra studied under R. Abba, then went abroad with two colleagues, R. Kahana and R. Huna the son of R. Ika. He debated halakha with Abaye and Rava, and was probably a disciple of Rava, who would sometimes impose various tasks upon him. He had a brother named Dimi.

He engaged in trading, and in his business would go in dangerous places. One of his business partners was Issur Giora (Issur the proselyte), father of Rav Mari bar Rachel, and the son-in-law of Samuel of Nehardea. However, Safra was sufficiently dedicated to his Torah studies that he would only engage in business to the minimal extent necessary to support himself, and not even to support other people such as his brothers.

He was known for his honesty. Once a buyer offered a certain price for Safra's merchandise. Safra mentally agreed to the price, but was unable to answer immediately as he was reciting the shema. The seller took this as a rejection, and offered a higher bid. However, when Safra was able to answer, he insisted on taking the price first offered.

He would take care to perform some of the cooking for Shabbat, even though this could have been done by other members of his household.

Rav Safra was single most or all of his life.
