= Rabbi Yitzchak =

3rd-century rabbi in the Land of Israel

- רבי יצחק
- Title: Rabbi, Amora

Personal life
- Born: Land of Israel
- Known for: Talmudic scholar, reestablished the Nehardea Academy

Religious life
- Religion: Judaism

Jewish leader
- Teacher: Rabbi Yochanan, Rabbi Hiyya
- Period in office: 3rd century (third generation of amoraim)

Rabbi Yitzchak was a rabbi who lived in the 3rd century (third generation of amoraim) in the Land of Israel.

He was likely a student of Rabbi Yochanan.

There existed several rabbis of this name. According to Rashi and Rashbam, the Rabbi Yitzchak who taught aggadah was named Yitzchak ben Pinchas, while the Rabbi Yitzchak who taught halacha was named Yitzchak ben Acha. Another Rabbi Yitzchak was the student of Rabbi Hiyya.

== Teachings ==
Rabbi Yitzchak transmitted laws in the names of Rabbi Yochanan, Reish Lakish, and others. Laws in his name were transmitted by Rav Nachman, Rav Chisda, Rav Yosef, Rava, and others. He is known for the principle "A person handles his wallet at all times", according to which if one finds money in a public area, one may presume the owner had already noticed the absence and given up the money's ownership out of despair.

He was a colleague of Rav Nachman, and his blessing to Rav Nachman is well known:

Let me give you a parable: A man was walking in the desert and was hungry and tired and thirsty, and found a tree with sweet fruit and pleasant shade and the aqueduct going beneath it. He ate its fruit and drank its water and sat in its shade, and when he desired to leave, he said: "Tree, tree, how can I bless you? If I say that your fruit should be sweet - they are already sweet. That your shadow should be pleasant - it is already pleasant. That the aqueduct should go beneath you - the aqueduct already goes beneath you. Rather, may all the plantings that are planted from you be like you!" So with you, how can I bless you? With Torah - you have Torah; with wealth - you have wealth, with children - you have children. Rather, may all your offspring be like you!
