= Horayot =

Tractate of the Mishnah and the Talmud

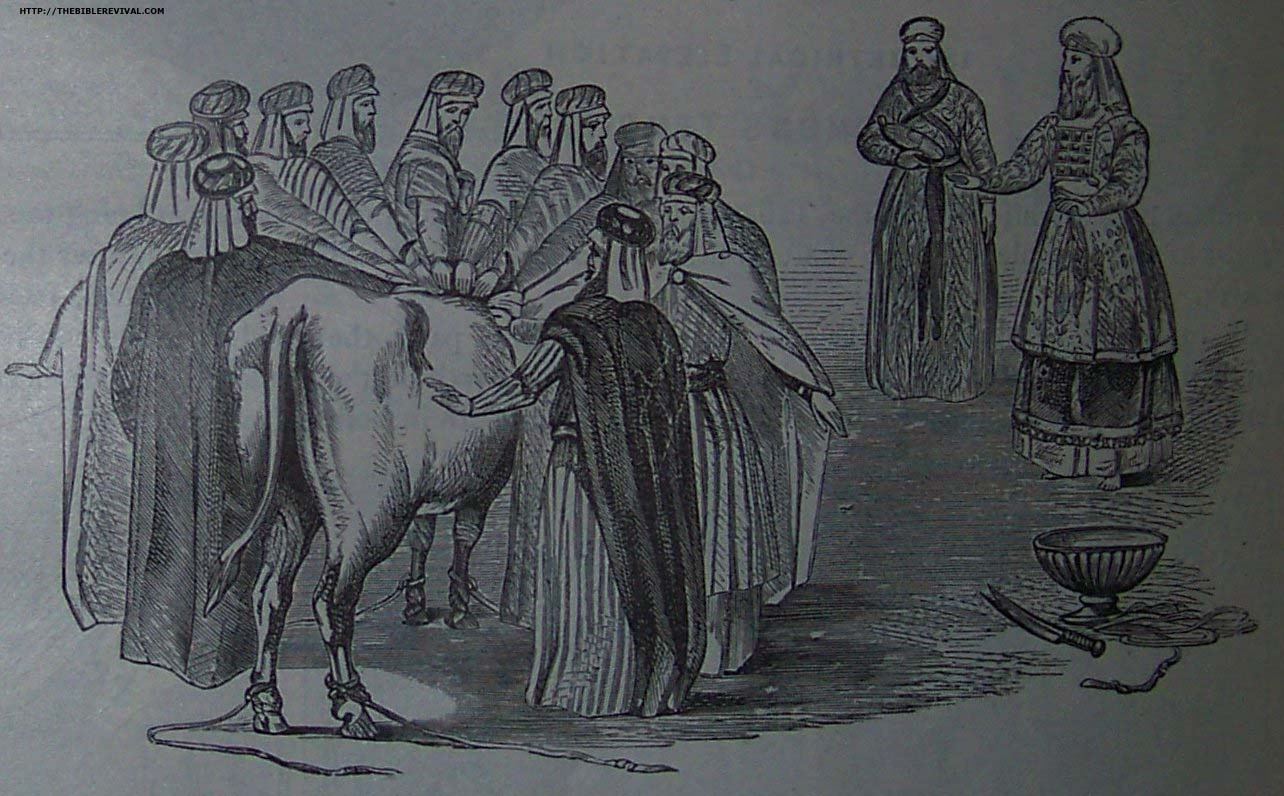
- National Sin Offering, drawing from Holman Bible

Tractate of the Talmud
- Seder: Nezikin
- Number of mishnahs: 20
- Chapters: 3
- Babylonian Talmud pages: 13
- Jerusalem Talmud pages: 19
- Tosefta chapters: 2

Horayot (Hebrew: הוֹרָיוֹת; "Decisions") is a tractate in Seder Nezikin in the Talmud.

In the Mishnah, this is the tenth and last tractate in Nezikin, the ninth tractate in the Babylonian Talmud, and the eighth in the Jerusalem Talmud. It consists of three chapters in the Mishnah and two in the Tosefta. The tractate mainly discusses laws pertaining to erroneous rulings by a Jewish court, as well as unwitting actions performed by leading authorities of the Jewish people, and the sacrificial offerings (Hebrew korban, plural korbanot) that might be brought as a consequence of these actions. The conclusion of the tractate (12a-13b) deals with the prioritization of korbanot in the temple and explores the question of how to quantify human life in emergencies.

== Mishnah ==
Mishnah-D-Nezikin2-Vilna

The Mishnah of Horayot is the final work of Nezikin. It contains three chapters. There are twenty paragraphs of Mishnah, or twenty Mishnayot, within the three chapters. These chapters deal with the verses in the Torah (Leviticus 4) that specify different procedures for the sin offering brought by a private individual, an anointed priest, a nasi, and an entire community. The "community's" offering is understood to be that which is brought when the community has followed an erroneous ruling by the higher court. In addition to the discussion in Leviticus 4, the Torah also mentions community offerings. The sages understand the second passage in Numbers to be referencing the sin of unintentional idolatry committed by the congregation.

=== Chapter 1 – Sacrifice for unintentional sins ===
Maimonides sums up the conditions necessary for the bringing of such a sacrifice, the conditions being found in the first and second chapters, as follows: (1) the head of the Sanhedrin and all its members must have been present when the decision was rendered; (2) every one of them must have been fully qualified to serve as a member of that body; (3) the decision must have been passed by a unanimous vote; (4) the error must concern a Biblical law; (5) at least a majority of the people must have followed the decision in practice; (6) those who followed the decision in practice must have been unaware of the mistake, and must have supposed that they were acting in accordance with law; (7) the error must have been due merely to ignorance of a matter of detail, and not to ignorance of the existence of the whole Biblical law in question. Unless these conditions are present, every one of those who have acted in accordance with the erroneous enactment must bring an individual offering.

=== Chapter 2 – The unintentional sins of the High Priest and King ===
The anointed priest who had interpreted a Biblical law erroneously, and acted accordingly, was required to bring a special sacrifice. The same conditions, that governed the case of an erroneous ruling of the court with regard to the practice of the community, governed also the erroneous decision of the anointed priest with regard to his own practice. The laws regarding the special sacrifice of the Leading Elder of the Sanhedrin, the Nasi, are also discussed in this chapter.

=== Chapter 3 – Precedence ===
In the cases of the anointed priest and the Nasi, whose tenure of office is temporary, a question might arise about the kind of sacrifice they must bring for sins committed before entering their offices or after leaving them. If the sin was committed before they assumed office, they were considered private individuals. If the sin was committed after they left their offices, the Nasi was regarded as an individual, while the status of the anointed priest was unchanged. The Mishnah (10a) states that the Nasi is considered the king, deriving this from the verse in Leviticus 4:22, that "all the commandments of the Lord his God." This verse must refer to the king, who alone has only God above him.

The Mishnah clarifies the meaning of the Hebrew word Mashiach, anointed one or messiah, in the context of the high priesthood. The "anointed priest" must bring a bull as an offering for an unwitting sin. Still, the High Priest who is not anointed (referred to as the High Priest of multiple garments, because of his extended duties during the Yom Kippur rites) does not bring that bull-offering for unwitting sins. The Mishnah states that there are two differences between the High Priest currently serving in that position and a High Priest who is not in the active role: (1) the serving High Priest brings the bull-offering on Yom Kippur, and (2) the daily gift offering of flour is prepared by the serving High Priest. The Mishnah begins prioritizing the distribution of charity money or lost objects to people based on their gender or title. The Mishnah ranks people from priests to slaves in terms of priority—priests, Levites, Israelites, illegitimate mamzers, Nethinim (the alleged descendants of the Gibeonites), proselytes, and then freed slaves. However, the Mishnah then states that this prioritization is overridden by one's level of scholarship or piety: "This is only when all other things are equal, but in the case of an ignorant priest and a scholar who is an illegitimate mamzer, the latter must precede the priest in all honors".

== Talmud ==
The Tractate Horayot in the Babylonian Talmud consists of only fourteen pages. In many editions, it is printed with tractate Avodah Zarah. The Gemara is mainly devoted to interpreting the laws of the Mishnah dealing with sacrifices for unintentional sin, with a few aggadic digressions in the third chapter. The commentary attributed to Rashi is more profuse here than in other parts of the Talmud. There is reason to believe that this commentary on Horayot attributed to Rashi was composed by the school of Rabbeinu Gershom. The Tosafot published in the Vilna Edition Shas occur only in the first two chapters, the style and method, mainly of an interpretive nature, being very different from those of the Tosafot in other books. In the Vilna edition, besides the commentary of Rabbeinu Hananel, there is a commentary called Tosafot HaRosh, attributed to Asher ben Jehiel. The earliest printed editions of the Babylonian Talmud, from Venice forward, include the writings of the Jerusalem Talmud on Horayot at the end of the printing. This was done because the printers could not find extensive Tosafot on Horayot. Revisions or minor edits to the text of Horayot were done for each printed edition.

=== Chapter 1 of Babylonian Talmud Horayot ===
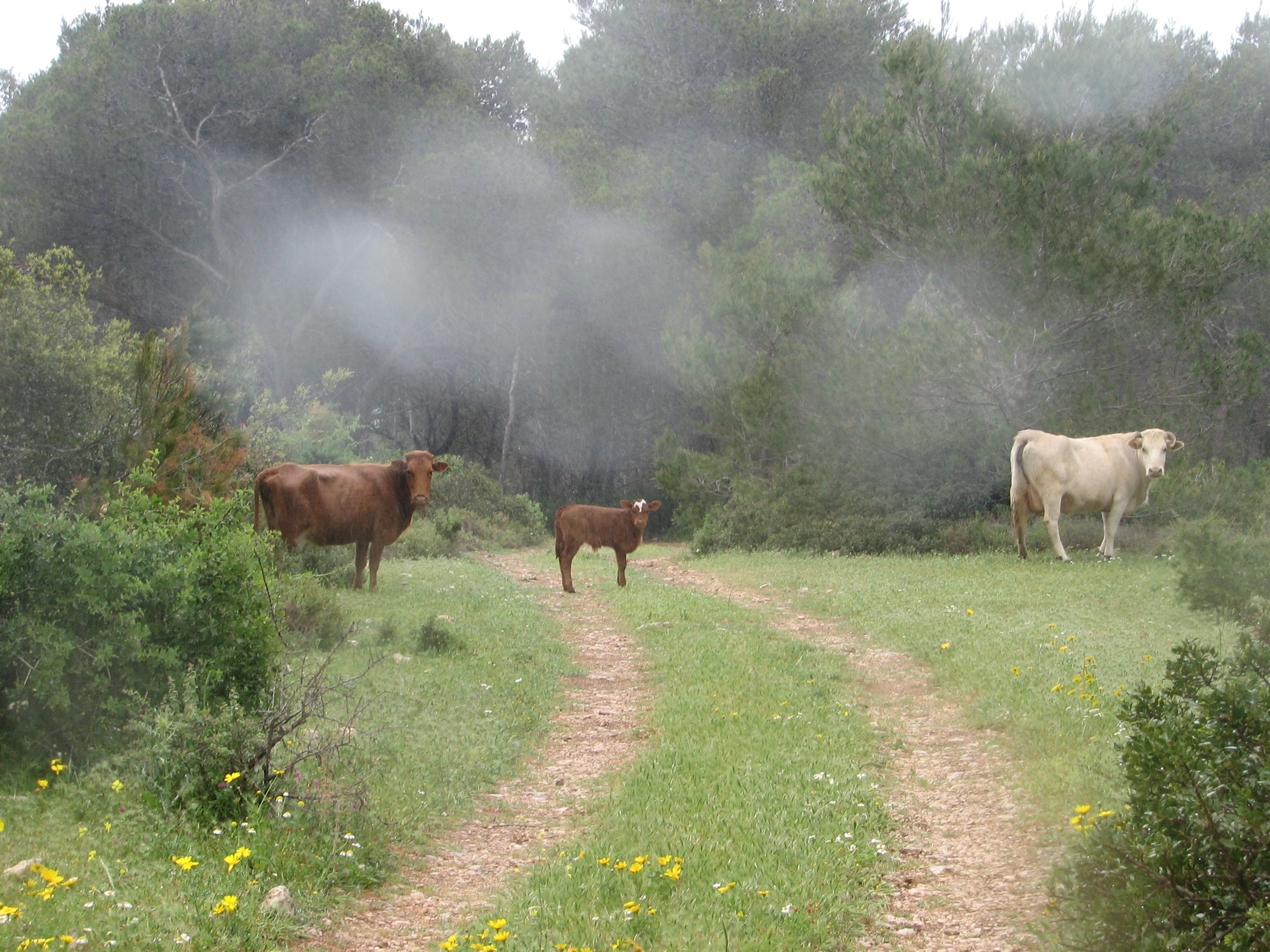
Three cows grazing at Carmel Park

The first Mishnah discusses the authority of the sages and the responsibility to act autonomously and not follow a misguided ruling. A sage who is an expert in Halakha and knows that the court was mistaken in its ruling, should not follow a misguided ruling of the court and perform a forbidden action. This applies to an individual who has a great understanding of Halakha. However, an individual who is not an expert and does not know that the court's ruling was indeed misguided would be exempt from punishment were that person to transgress against a commandment by following the court's incorrect ruling.

From this first Mishnah, and the Talmudic discussion that follows, the conclusion is drawn that experts in Halakha are obligated to weigh their internal truth and autonomous decision before acting on halakhic matters. As one modern writer notes, the "inner truth" of Halakha takes precedence over a court's instructions, especially when the court's instructions require one to transgress against Halakha. The Mishnah calls for experts on Halakha to be independent in reaching halakhic conclusions.

The Gemara rules that each tribe in Israel is considered as a congregation, after the verse "And Jehoshaphat stood in the congregation." However, the bull that atones for the communal transgression is only brought when the majority of tribes or the majority of Israel's population err and follow a mistaken ruling. Twelve bulls are offered at the Temple for a sin of the entire people, but for the sin of idol worship, twelve bulls and twelve goats are sacrificed.

The Gemara proceeds to further limit the cases in which a court would bring a bull that atones for communal transgression. The only times when the bull is offered to atone for communal transgression is when the entire congregation sinned based on a court ruling on a detail of mitzvah prohibited in the Torah; i.e., no bull would be brought if the court annulled an entire negative prohibition and the congregation blindly followed them. Likewise, no bull atoning for communal transgression would be brought if the court rules on a matter so obvious that even the most straightforward reading of the Hebrew Bible would lead one to realize that the court is mistaken. In the language of the Talmud, if the matter is such that even the Sadducees acknowledge it is a prohibited mitzvah in the Torah, no bull would be brought in such a case of communal transgression following a court's unwitting ruling.

=== Chapter 2 of Babylonian Talmud Horayot ===
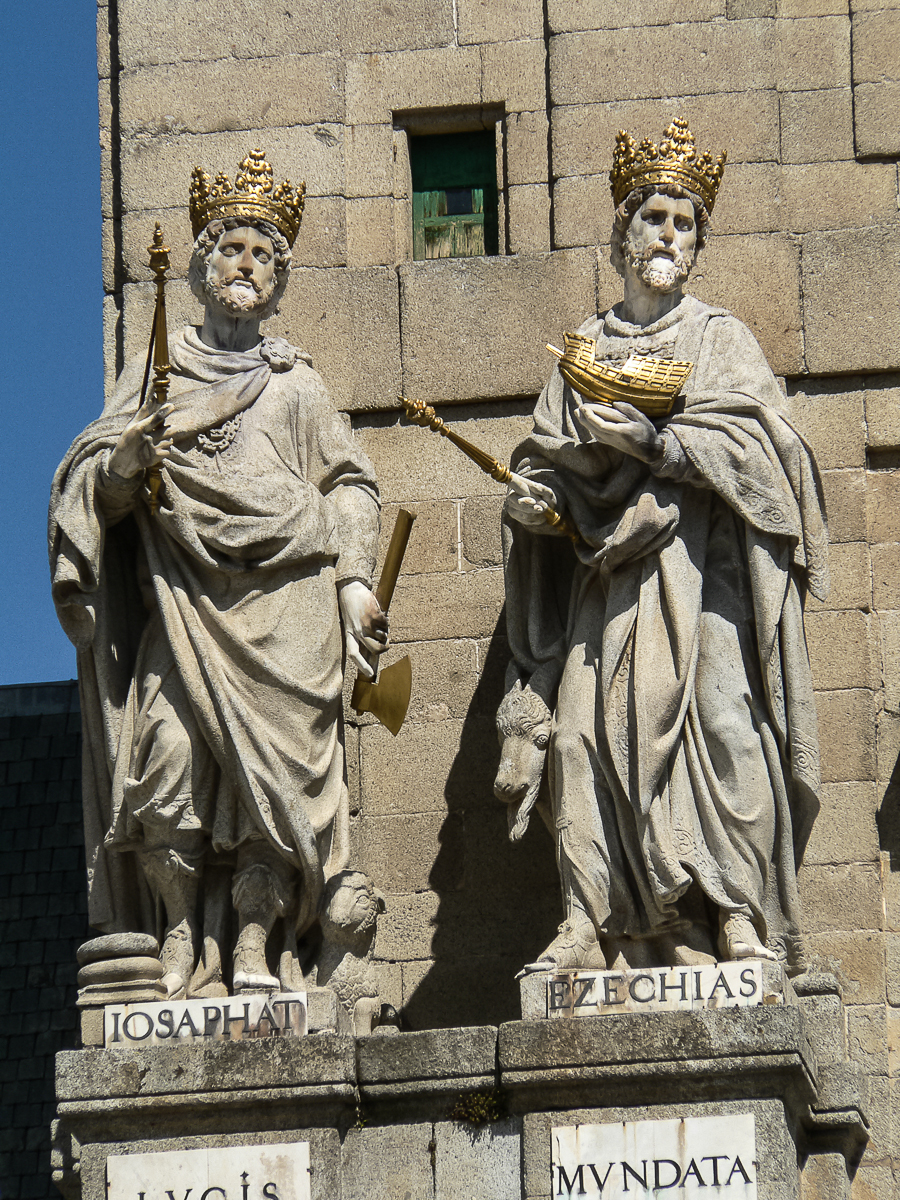
Statues of Kings Jehoshaphat and Hezekiah at El Escorial, Spain

Chapter two begins with the words "The Rulings of the Anointed Priest". The chapter deals with the sacrificial offerings required by unwitting sin. The Gemara clarifies that a sin offering (korban ḥatat, IPA: [χaˈtat]) would be brought either by the High Priest or by the king, who is called the Nasi in Leviticus. In Leviticus, the High Priest and the Nasi, in particular, brought special sacrifices in Leviticus 4:9 and 4:23, apparently because their errors caused harm to their people.

The Gemara understands Leviticus 4:3, "guilt upon the people", as teaching that the anointed priest and the king bring a sacrifice due to their unwitting actions similar to that required to expiate the "guilt upon the people". This means that just as in the case of the people at large, who bring a sacrifice after transgressing due to mistaken rulings, so likewise is it in the case of the anointed priest and the king. The High Priest brings the sacrifice of a bull only after he rules, and then acts on that mistaken ruling, in error, a case that parallels the sacrifice of a bull by the people at large: i.e., when the unwitting action was committed after a mistaken ruling was issued. The anointed priest does not bring an offering if his transgression was not based on a mistaken ruling. There is a discussion on the status of the anointed priest parallel to that on the Sanhedrin. Rav Pappa teaches that the case in question is one in which the anointed priest was a distinguished Torah scholar with the same authority to issue rulings as the Sanhedrin.

The anointed priest does not bring a provisional guilt offering in cases of doubt with regard to his transgression. Within the category of the sin offering, there is a subcategory of "sliding-scale offerings" that individuals bring based on their financial standing. The anointed priest does bring the provisional guilt-offering in cases where an individual would. The Mishnah teaches that for offerings in which the penalty is kareth for intentional violation, the individual brings a sacrifice if he transgressed unwittingly. In this specific case of unwitting transgression, the Nasi (king) should bring a male goat, and not the female goat, (Hebrew: seira), or ewe (Hebrew: kivsa) that would be brought as a sin offering by the people here and elsewhere. In contrast, the anointed priest and the Sanhedrin would bring a bull, as was mentioned previously. However, if the sin which was transgressed unwittingly after a mistaken ruling was a sin of idolatry, then the king would bring a female goat as a sin offering, as would the anointed priest and the regular individual. The Gemara proceeds to discuss the details of the provisional guilt offering, which the Mishnah states does not apply to the Sanhedrin or the anointed priest, but does apply to the individual and the Nasi.

=== Chapter 3 of Babylonian Talmud Horayot ===
Chapter 3 opens with a discussion of the responsibility of the High Priest and the King for committing sins, with the question being whether those figures would be responsible to atone for transgressions committed prior to attaining the office and similar matters. The king's sacrifice for an unwitting sin is that of a male goat, in contrast to the female goat or ewe brought by the common person, and this is true even if the sin took place before he became king. When an apostate sins unwittingly, he does not bring a sin offering. The sages seek to define the parameters of apostasy in the context of sins of pleasure contrasted with sins to anger. The chapter also discusses personal status of individuals in comparison to figures who have status accorded to them on account of the office they hold or their lineage. Other concepts raised by the sages in chapter 3 include "a transgression for the sake of heaven". "Rav Nachman bar Yitzchak says: A transgression performed for the sake of Heaven is greater than a mitzva performed not for its own sake, as it is stated: 'Blessed above women shall be Yael, the wife of Heber the Kenite, above women in the tent shall she be blessed' (Judges 5:24)."

The laws regarding anointing oil for the kings are explained, including the history of the practice (in Horayot 11b-12a), and also in the Jerusalem Talmud (in Horayot 3:4, 47c). The sages describe how anointing oil was made only one time in history by Moses (Ex.30:31-33). The original amount that Moses prepared was used by Aaron and his descendants until it was hidden by Josiah. The High Priest and the "priest anointed for war" (Deut. 20:2) were the only priests anointed with that special oil. The High Priest and the anointed priest were anointed with sacred oil during the First Temple, but the high priests who came afterward, in the Second Temple, relied on a different oil. Moses prepared sacred oil for the High Priest for the kings from the Davidic line in the First Temple, but Davidic kings whose succession to the monarchy was unquestioned were not anointed. After King Josiah hid the original anointing oil, a balsamic oil recipe was used during the Second Temple. The sages state that, "One anoints the kings only upon a spring", as an omen so that their rule will be drawn out in time like water flowing from a spring. This is derived from the story of the anointing of Solomon (I Kings 1:33-34). The anointing oil for David and his descendants was done from a horn, but for Saul from a flask. The kings would be anointed by placing the oil around their head in a crown-like manner, but the priests would have the oil placed from their eyes to the head in the manner of the Greek letter Chi.

There are several differences between the High Priest and the ordinary priest. In contrast to the ordinary priest, the High Priest is forbidden to marry a widow and is obligated to marry a virgin. The High Priest may not become ritually impure for the mitzvah of burial of a close relative. The High Priest tears his garments in mourning differently than the ordinary priest. The High Priest participates in bringing Temple offerings, even if this were to be immediately after the death of a close relative, i.e. during the time of aninut.

The Gemara (12b) proceeds to explicate an argument between Rav (Abba Arikha) and Shmuel (Samuel of Nehardea) regarding how the High Priest tears his garment in an expression of mourning in accordance with the Mishnah. Rav says that the High Priest tears the cloth at the bottom edge of the garment, but Shmuel says he tears from below the neckline. The Gemara explicates that the position of Shmuel is partially in accord with that expressed by Rav Yehuda (Judah bar Ilai). Rav Yehuda believes that any tear that does not break the neckline is worthless, but Rav Yehuda also believes that the High Priest should not tear anything at all. Shmuel's position, however, is that it is not a legally binding tear for the High Priest to rip a garment from below the neckline without rending the neckline. Still, the tear itself, minor as it is, shows that the High Priest is experiencing grief after the passing of his relatives. The Talmud next explicates the statement in the Mishnah that "Any mitzvah that is more frequent than another mitzvah precedes that other mitzvah" when the fulfillment of two commandments may occur simultaneously. The Talmud explains that the source for this is from the verse (Numbers 28:23), "Beside the burnt offering of the morning, which is for a daily burnt-offering." A baraita of the sages is then cited that orders the priority of those sacrifices from the preceding conversation: that of the bull of the anointed priest, the bull of the congregation, and the bull for an unwitting communal sin, and for idol worship. The principle that all sin offerings should precede burnt offerings is established. Likewise, it is taught that the goat sacrifice for idol worship precedes the goat of the king, because the communal precedes the individual.

The Talmud continues the discussion about priority or precedence when saving a life or rescuing an individual from captivity. The principal is stated that, "A Torah scholar precedes the king of Israel because in the case of a sage who dies we would have no one like him, but in the case of a king of Israel who dies, all of Israel are fit for royalty." This overriding condition aside, the Talmud quantifies the priority of life in a hypothetical case where one life should be saved with decisions (triage) based on title or rank, such that higher priests or administrators in the Temple should have their lives be saved first. Similarly, a triage of life based on hierarchy of class is categorized such that the order is from highest to lowest: Priest, Levite, Israelite, mamzer, Nethinim, convert, and lastly the slave. The slave is last because of the curse of Ham. However, the overriding caveat to this discussion was already provided by the Mishnah. This triage based on class hierarchy is only applicable if they are of equal wisdom, but a wise mamzer precedes others of higher social rank.

== Aggada ==
Animation of 1P/Halley orbit - 2061 apparition.

Chapter 3 of Horayot, unlike the previous two chapters, includes narrative stories about the sages, or Aggada. Horayot 10a tells the story of Rabbi Gamliel and Rabbi Yehoshua on a boat journey. The story has been cited as the first reference to Halley's Comet as a periodic event in world literature. The story is told that:

Rabban Gamliel and Rabbi Yehoshua were travelling together on a ship. Rabban Gamliel had sufficient bread for the journey. Rabbi Yehoshua also had sufficient bread, and additionally he had flour. The journey lasted longer than expected, and Rabban Gamliel's bread was finished. He relied on Rabbi Yehoshua's flour for nourishment. Rabban Gamliel said to Rabbi Yehoshua: Did you know from the outset that we would have so substantial a delay? Is that the reason that you brought flour with you? Rabbi Yehoshua said to Rabban Gamliel: There is one star that rises once in seventy years and misleads sailors at sea, causing their journeys to be extended. And I said: perhaps that star will rise during our journey and mislead us.

Halley's Comet animation

That story from Horayot is a definite identification of a comet with an orbit of seventy years. Halley's Comet was seen in 66 CE when Rabban Gamaliel II and Rabbi Yehoshua, a.k.a. Joshua ben Hananiah, were beginning their careers as sages. Dr. Jeremy Brown has stated that it is "both self-evident and beyond question" that Rabbi Yehoshua should be credited as the first to describe the time frame for the comet known today as Halley's Comet. This first identification of Halley's Comet by Rabbi Yehoshua is likewise noted by R. Patai in The Children of Noah: Jewish Seafaring in Ancient Times (Princeton University Press 1998) and I. A. Ben Yosef in his monograph "The Concept of Nature in Classical Judaism".

That story was cited in the Talmud to exemplify what it means for a leader to be a servant of the people. The sages had told the story of King Uzziah who was removed from his position of kingship after becoming a leper. The Bible (II Kings 15:5) states that he went to a house of freedom after he was removed from being king. Until then, the sages explain, he was a servant of the people. Similarly, Rabbi Yehoshua tells Rabban Gamliel on the boat about two great sages, Rabbi Elazar Hisma and Rabbi Yohanan ben Gudgeda, who though brilliant have no food nor garments. Rabban Gamliel sends for them to become servants of the people (Hor 10b).

Another story in the third chapter informs us of the bifurcation of powers in Jewish life in Palestine and Babylonia. Rabbi Judah ha-Nasi asks his colleague if he were to sin as the Nasi, or Patriarch in Palestine, would he be liable to bring a male goat as a sin offering in the same manner a king should. Rabbi Hiyya, Hiyya bar Abba, responds that the offering would be that of a commoner; i.e., a female goat or ewe. The reason for this being that there was a corresponding center of power in Babylonia of the Exilarch, so Rabbi Yehuda HaNasi was not akin to a king, especially since Palestine was under the authority of Babylonia in the opinion attributed to Rabbi Hiyya (Hor.11b). Rav Safra thereon expounds upon the verse in Gen. 49:10 that in Babylonia the Exilarch had political authority (i.e. the scepter) but in Palestine they had religious authority (scribal staff). The sages proceed to discuss various legends regarding the anointing oil of the High Priest in the Bible and the First Temple Kings of Judah and Israel. Rav Pappa states that they used balsam oil, or balm of Gilead, for the kings of Israel and for King Jehoahaz of Judah. The reason why they used balsamic oil for the anointing of King Jehoahaz is that King Josiah had hidden away the anointing oil of Moses and Aaron, together with the manna and Aaron's rod with its almonds and blossoms.

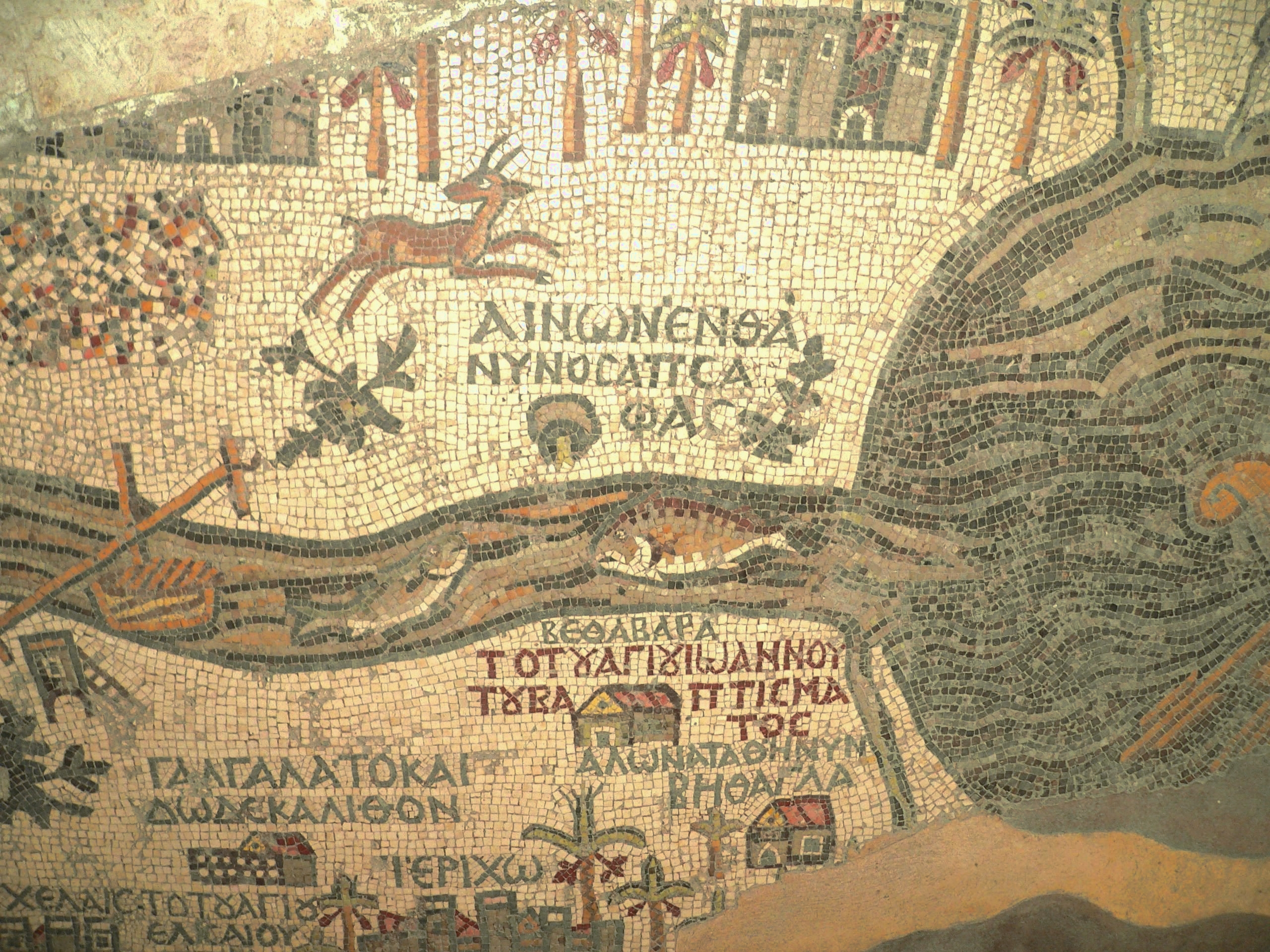
Balsam branch seen to the right of running gazelle from the Madaba Map mosaic.

Horayot 12a discusses augury and acceptable predictors of the future. Abaye notes the tradition of eating certain foods on Rosh Hashana—such as squash, fenugreek, leeks, beets, and dates—that are foods of a good omen. Superstitious practices for ensuring a successful business or trip are recorded by Rabbi Ammi. It is noted there that some would seek to see their shadow in a dark space (or shadow of a shadow) to know if they would be successful on their business trip. This superstitious practice noted in Tractate Horayot was discussed by David Abudarham in Seville in the fourteenth century and in many commentaries discussing the augury of seeing shadows. Abudarham notes that on the night of Hoshana Rabba people would walk out naked in the dark covered only in a cloth to see if they could see the shadow of their head. He cites this passage from Horayot 12a as a text arguing that the practice was not legitimate. The conclusion of Horayot deals with precedence in sacrifices and prioritizes the life of the learned sage above all else. In this context the gemara informs us that it was the custom to rise in the study hall at the entrance of the sages bearing the title of Nasi, Hakham, and deputy Nasi. Rabban Shimon ben Gamliel was the Nasi at that time and thought there should be distinctions made in the practice of standing for him and those of lower rank to him, namely Rav Meir and Rav Natan.

That day, when Rabban Shimon ben Gamliel instituted these provisions, Rabbi Meir and Rabbi Natan were not there. The following day when they came to the study hall, they saw that the people did not stand before them as the matter was typically done. They said: What is this? The people said to them: This is what Rabban Shimon ben Gamliel instituted. Rabbi Meir said to Rabbi Natan: I am the Ḥakham and you are the deputy Nasi. Let us devise a matter and do to him as he did to us. What shall we do to him? Let us say to him: Reveal to us tractate Okatzim, Uktzim which he does not know. And once it is clear to all that he did not learn, he will not have anything to say. Then we will say to him: "Who can express the mighty acts of the Lord, shall make all His praises heard?" (Psalms 106:2), indicating: For whom is it becoming to express the mighty acts of the Lord? It is becoming for one capable of making all His praises heard, and not for one who does not know one of the tractates. We will remove him from his position as Nasi, and I will be deputy Nasi and you will be Nasi.

Rabbi Ya'akov ben Korshei heard Rabbi Meir and Rabbi Natan plotting to ask Rabban Shimon ben Gamliel to teach Uktzim. He proceeded to sabotage their plan by reciting Uktzim to Rabbi Shimon ben Gamliel so that he would know the tractate. The next day when Meir and Natan entered the study hall, the Nasi was already well versed in Uktzim and taught it in the study hall when they asked him to recite. In response to their plot, the Nasi blocked the two conspirators from entering the place of study. The two figures, Natan and Meir, continued to direct the conversation within the study hall even while they were blocked from entering, by means of throwing little notes into the hall. Rabbi Yosei asked the other sages, "How is it that the Torah is outside (the study hall) and we are inside?" The Nasi, Rabban Shimon ben Gamliel, admitted them but censured them by erasing their names from their teachings, such that Rabbi Meir's teachings were recorded as being taught by "Others" and Rabbi Natan's teachings were recorded as taught by "Some say" (Hor. 13b).

== Placement in the Order Nezikin ==
The topics of Horayot, relating largely to sacrificial offerings, may seem to fit well within the Order of Kodashim (holies). In fact, Maimonides codifies the laws of Horayot in his Mishneh Torah in Sefer Korbanot, Hilkhot Shegagot or under the laws of Unintentional Sacrificial Offerings. Maimonides explains that the reason for the compilers of the Mishnah deciding on placing Horayot last in the Order of Nezikin was that after they dealt with torts and the laws of capital punishment, and then with ethics in Pirkei Avot, they felt it necessary to include a section on mistaken rulings. Maimonides writes that we are all human and have the capacity for sin, and even the greatest of judges may issue mistaken rulings.
