= Bevai bar Abaye =

Jewish Talmudist who lived in Babylonia

- Born: Babylonia
- Other names: Bebai ben Abaye, Bebai II, Bevai bar Abin
- Occupation(s): Talmudist, Judge
- Known for: Presiding judge in Pumbedita, Talmudic scholar

Bevai bar Abaye (Imperial Aramaic: ביבי בר אביי) was a Jewish Talmudist who lived in Babylonia, known as an amora of the fourth and fifth amoraic generations (fourth century CE).

== Biography ==
He was the son of the celebrated Abaye, and presiding judge in Pumbedita, where his father had directed the Talmudic Academy. Some rabbinic chronologists suggest his identity with Bebai II (Bevai bar Abin), which, however, is chronologically incorrect, the latter having been a fellow-pupil of Rav Yosef, whereas Bebai ben Abaye was a contemporary of Nahman ben Isaac, Kahana III, Pappi, and Huna ben Joshua. As Abaye was a scion of the priestly house of Eli, which was doomed to premature death, both Pappi and Huna ben Joshua frequently taunted Bebai with being descended from frail (short-lived) stock, and therefore with uttering frail, untenable arguments.

Bebai bar Abaye seems to have led a contemplative life; and legend relates some curious stories about him.
