= Rav Nachman bar Yitzchak =

Babylonian Rabbi

You might be looking for Nachman bar Huna or Nachman bar Yaakov.

Rav Nachman bar Yitzchak (Hebrew: רב נחמן בר יצחק; died 356 CE) was a Babylonian rabbi, of the fourth and fifth generations of amoraim.

It is generally accepted that references to "Rav Nachman" in the Talmud refer to Rav Nachman bar Yaakov, not to Rav Nachman bar Yitzchak.

== Biography ==
His mother's brother was Rav Aha bar Yosef.

Legend states that an astrologer predicted to his mother that her son would become a thief. She required him to have his head covered at all times, though he did not understand the purpose of this requirement. Once he was sitting and studying under a tree, and his head-covering slipped off. He was overcome by desire and took a cluster of dates from the tree (which did not belong to him).

He was a disciple of Abaye, Rava, Rav Nachman, and Rav Chisda. In his youth he studied together with Rava, sitting one row behind Rava in the beit midrash and occasionally asking each other questions.

Later on, while Rav Yosef was the head of the yeshivah of Pumbedita, Rava became the head of the yeshivah in Mechoza, while Nachman bar Yitzchak was appointed the chief lecturer (Reish Kallah) under Rava. He later went to Sura, where Rav Nahman bar Chisda drew particular attention to him and frequently repeated his responsa in the beit midrash. When Rava died, he succeeded Rava as head of the school (which was transferred from Mahoza to Pumbedita), a position he held for four years.

== Teachings ==
=== Halakha ===
He contributed to halakhah chiefly by collecting, arranging, and transmitting the teachings and decisions of his predecessors, which were thus saved from oblivion. He also employed mnemonics to facilitate memorizing the halakhot which he had arranged, thus beginning the redaction of the Talmud. He distinctly recognized his position regarding halakhah, saying of himself "I am neither a sage nor a seer, nor even a scholar as contrasted with the majority. I am a transmitter and a codifier, and the beit ha-midrash follows me in its decisions."

He taught that a person who follows Beit Shammai in halacha "deserves death" - in contrast to Rav Yehezkel who says such a person "has acted [i.e., has fulfilled his obligation]", and in accord with Rav Yosef who says such a person "has done nothing."

The honor of the Sabbath was of great importance to him. He would personally do menial work in its honor. He would say that "one who honors the Sabbath is saved from the oppression of the exile".

=== Aggadah ===
He appears frequently in aggadah as one who arranges and explains the words of other authorities, and he frequently cites Biblical passages in support of their teachings. When the interpretations by others deviate from the Masoretic vocalization, he attempts to show that reference to the written form of the word in question allows such varying explanations. He often interprets rare or ambiguous terms in the Mishnah by citing analogous passages.

In addition, he also had many independent teachings of his own, including:

- "Why is wisdom likened to a tree? Because just as a tiny piece of wood kindles a large one, so the minor Torah scholar sharpens the great scholar."
- "Whoever enjoys a wedding meal and gladdens the groom, it is as if he built one of the ruins of Jerusalem."
- "Greater is a sin for the sake of Heaven than the fulfillment of a commandment that is not for the sake of heaven". This statement is seen as a justification for the actions of Lot's daughters who had sex with Lot to maintain humanity, Tamar who pretended to be a prostitute to establish the line of her late husband, and Yael who (according to the rabbis) had sex with Sisera before killing him.

He condemned arrogance and anger. When Rava stated that a little pride is becoming a scholar, Nachman replied, "Neither it, nor part of it!"

He had a sense of wit, and often played on the name of a tanna who brought baraitot before him. He also frequently employed proverbs.
