= Yeiush =

Yeiush (Hebrew: יֵאוּשׁ, romanized: yēʾuš, lit. 'despair'), accepting a lost item is gone forever, is a concept in the Talmud regarding a Jew who loses an object (Hebrew: אֲבֵדָה, romanized: ʾəḇēḏā, lit. 'loss'), and another Jew finds it when the Jew who lost it is determined to have given up on the object. The general rule is that the original owner's yeiush releases the object into the public domain, thereby allowing a finder of the object to keep it and releasing the finder from the obligation to return it to the original owner.

There is:

- "Yeiush shelo mida'at" meaning a person declares hope lost without knowledge (or awareness of what happened to the lost object.)
- "Yeiush mida'at" meaning hope is declared lost with knowledge (or the intent of the owner to give up possession.)

== Yeiush shelo mida'at ==
Yei’ush shelo mida'at (Hebrew: יאוש שלא מדעת) occurs when the owner of a lost object does not know the object is lost (or does not know the circumstances surrounding the loss), but would have given up hope on finding the object had he known that the object was lost (e.g. if an item with no form of identification falls from the pocket of a person on a public thoroughfare but the person does not know that it has fallen). The legal significance of this scenario occurs if the object is found by another person before the owner of the property discovers his loss.

There was a Talmudic dispute between Abaye and Rava about whether this is a valid form of yeiush; i.e., whether the finder must return the object or whether he may keep it. Abaye maintained that this was not a valid form of yei’ūsh and thus the finder must return an object found under these circumstances. Rava allowed the finder to keep the object under these circumstances. The Talmud itself settles the dispute in favor of Abaye.

== Yeiush m'daat ==
Yei’ūsh m'daat (Hebrew: יאוש מדעת) occurs where the owner actually gives up hope on finding a lost object or where a reasonable person would have given up hope under the circumstances. It is undisputed in the Talmud that this occurrence releases the object into the public domain so that a finder of the object may then keep it.

Examples of scenarios where a person can be assumed to have given up hope on losing an object include:

- Where the object has no identifying mark and it not left in a specific location based on which it can be identified.
- Where an object has been carried out to sea.
- Where the object has been stolen by armed robbers.

There is a dispute if the concept of yei’ūsh is also effective by a stolen object; if the owner gives up hope after it was stolen from his possession. Some opinions hold that yei’ūsh works universally by lost objects as well as stolen goods. According to that opinion, the thief will be able to keep what he stole, but will still be obligated to reimburse the owner the worth of that article.

The Talmud in Baba Kama 65,66 discusses this at length and offers a reason to distinguish a stolen object from a lost object. In them former case when the yei’ūsh occurred it was after it entered the hands of the thief unlawfully, while by a lost object the assumption is that the finder picked it up after the owner had already given up hope. In the event that the thief sold the stolen goods to a third party, all opinions would agree that he may keep it, since it came into hands after the yei’ūsh. This is known in the Talmud as the combination of yei’ūsh (despair) with shinuī reshūth (change of domain).

== See also ==
- Bava Kamma
- Bava Metzia
- Halakha
- Mishpat Ivri
- Sukkah
- finders keepers
