= Maimonides' rule =

Rule used to evaluate the effect of class size on student test scores

Maimonides' rule is named after the 12th-century rabbinic scholar Maimonides, who cited a Talmudic verse in Bava Batra regarding a correlation between class size and students' achievements.

== Origin ==
The quote relating to Maimonides is found within the Mishneh Torah, Torah Study 2:5, published c.1176-1178.

עֶשְׂרִים וַחֲמִשָּׁה תִּינוֹקוֹת לְמֵדִים אֵצֶל מְלַמֵּד אֶחָד. הָיוּ יוֹתֵר עַל עֶשְׂרִים וַחֲמִשָּׁה עַד אַרְבָּעִים מוֹשִׁיבִין עִמּוֹ אַחֵר לְסַיְּעוֹ בְּלִמּוּדָם. הָיוּ יוֹתֵר עַל אַרְבָּעִים מַעֲמִידִין לָהֶם שְׁנֵי מְלַמְּדֵי תִּינוֹקוֹת:

25 young children learn with one teacher. If there are more than 25 - up to 40 - we appoint another person with him to assist him with their studies. If there are more than 40, we put two teachers of young children in place for them.

However, being a Torah commentary, Maimonides' rule dates back further: Talmudic figure Abba ben Joseph bar Ḥama (Rava) stated the following in Bava Batra 21a:10 (c.450 CE - 550 CE), where the rule is applied to 50, not 40, children.

וְאָמַר רָבָא: סַךְ מַקְרֵי דַרְדְּקֵי – עֶשְׂרִין וְחַמְשָׁה יָנוֹקֵי. וְאִי אִיכָּא חַמְשִׁין – מוֹתְבִינַן תְּרֵי; וְאִי אִיכָּא אַרְבְּעִין – מוֹקְמִינַן רֵישׁ דּוּכְנָא, וּמְסַיְּיעִין לֵיהּ מִמָּתָא.

And Rava said: The maximum number of students for one teacher of children is twenty-five children. And if there are fifty children in a single place, one establishes two teachers, so that each one teaches twenty-five students. And if there are forty children, one establishes an assistant, and the teacher receives help from the residents of the town to pay the salary of the assistant.

== Modern usage ==
Today this rule is widely used in educational research to evaluate the effect of class size on students' test scores. Maimonides' rule states that a class size may rise to an upper limit of 40 students. Once this quota is reached the class is cut in half, so instead of one class with forty-one students there are now two classes: one with twenty students and one with twenty-one students.

== Effectiveness ==
Joshua Angrist and Victor Lavy (1999) have used "the nonlinear relationship between the local number of students and the class size predicted by Maimonides' rule to estimate the impact of class size on student performance, and evaluate the effect of being just below the number of students for whom an additional teacher would be brought up, and of being just above this number."

Their results have shown highly irregular patterns in class size that are precisely mirrored in student achievement. They have found that a reduction in predicted class size of ten students is associated with a 0.25 standard deviation increase in fifth-graders' test scores.
