= Rabbah bar Abuha =

- רבה בר אבוה
- Title: Rabbi, Amora

Personal life
- Occupation: Rabbi

Religious life
- Religion: Judaism

Jewish leader
- Main work: Interpretations of various mishnaic passages; halakhic decisions
- Other: Religious judge at Mahuza
- Residence: Mahuza, Babylonia

Rabbah bar Abuha (or Rabbah bar Avuha; Hebrew: רבה בר אבוה) was a Babylonian rabbi of the second generation of amoraim.

== Biography ==
He was a student of Rav, and resided at Nehardea of Babylonia. He was the teacher and father-in-law of Rav Nachman. After Nehardea had been destroyed by Papa ben Neser in 259, he moved to Shekunzib (Hinzebu), and then again moved to Shilhe, then to Mahuza, where he settled along with Rav Nachman, and became a religious judge. There are allusions to a number of decisions and rulings made by him while at Mahuza.

He was related to the house of the exilarchs and is even said to have been an exilarch himself. Sherira Gaon claimed to be a descendant of his, and of the Davidic line.

According to legend, Rabbah was a friend of the prophet Elijah, who gave him leaves from paradise, so that he became rich.

A descendent was Sherira ben Hanina

== Teachings ==
Rabbah was not a prominent teacher; and he himself admitted that he was not thoroughly versed even in the four orders of the Mishnah, which were generally studied in the schools. Some of his interpretations of various mishnaic passages have been preserved, as well as confirmations of earlier halakhot and halakhic decisions of his own.

=== Quotes ===
- The commandment to love one's neighbor must be observed even in the execution of a criminal, since he should be granted as easy a death as possible.
