= Hosea 14 =

Chapter 14 of the Book of Hosea

- ← chapter 13 Joel 1 →
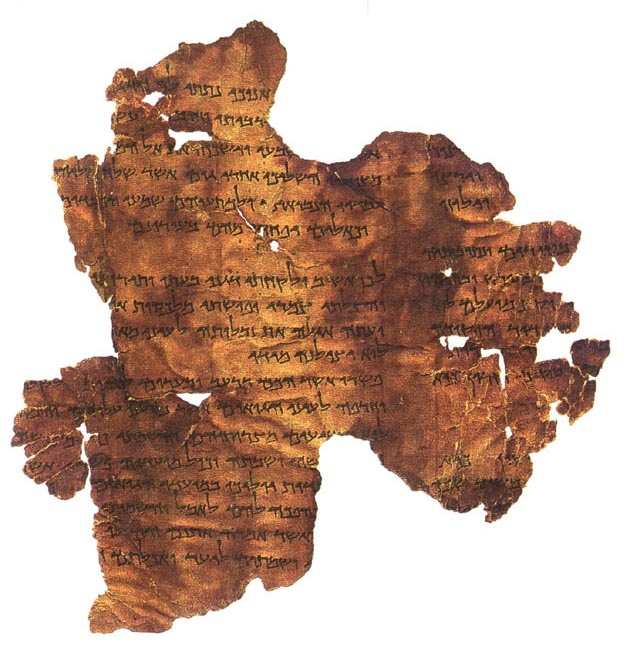
- 4Q166 "The Hosea Commentary Scroll", late first century B.C.
- Book: Book of Hosea
- Category: Nevi'im
- Christian Bible part: Old Testament
- Order in the Christian part: 28

Hosea 14 is the fourteenth and final chapter of the Book of Hosea in the Hebrew Bible or the Old Testament of the Christian Bible. In the Hebrew Bible, it is part of the Twelve Minor Prophets. This chapter concludes the prophecies attributed to the prophet Hosea, son of Beeri, with an exhortation to repentance (Hosea 14:1–3), a promise of God's blessing (Hosea 14:4–9), and a concluding verse resembling the wisdom tradition.

== Text ==
The original text was written in Hebrew. This chapter is divided into 9 verses in Christian Bibles, but 10 verses in the Hebrew Bible, which includes Hosea 13:16 as Hosea 14:1. This article generally follows the common numbering in Christian English Bible versions, with notes to the numbering in Hebrew Bible versions.

Some early manuscripts containing the text of this chapter in Hebrew come from the Masoretic Text tradition, including the Codex Cairensis (895), the Petersburg Codex of the Prophets (916), Aleppo Codex (10th century), Codex Leningradensis (1008). Fragments containing parts of this chapter in Hebrew were found among the Dead Sea Scrolls, including 4Q78 (4QXII^{c}; 75–50 BCE) with extant verses 1–5 (verse 1–6 in Masoretic text); and 4Q82 (4QXII^{g}; 25 BCE) with extant verses 8–9 (verses 9–10 in Masoretic text).

There is also a translation into Koine Greek known as the Septuagint, made in the last few centuries BCE. Extant ancient manuscripts of the Septuagint version include Codex Vaticanus (B; $\mathfrak{G}$^{B}; 4th century), Codex Alexandrinus (A; $\mathfrak{G}$^{A}; 5th century) and Codex Marchalianus (Q; $\mathfrak{G}$^{Q}; 6th century). (Note: The Book of Hosea is missing from the extant Codex Sinaiticus.)

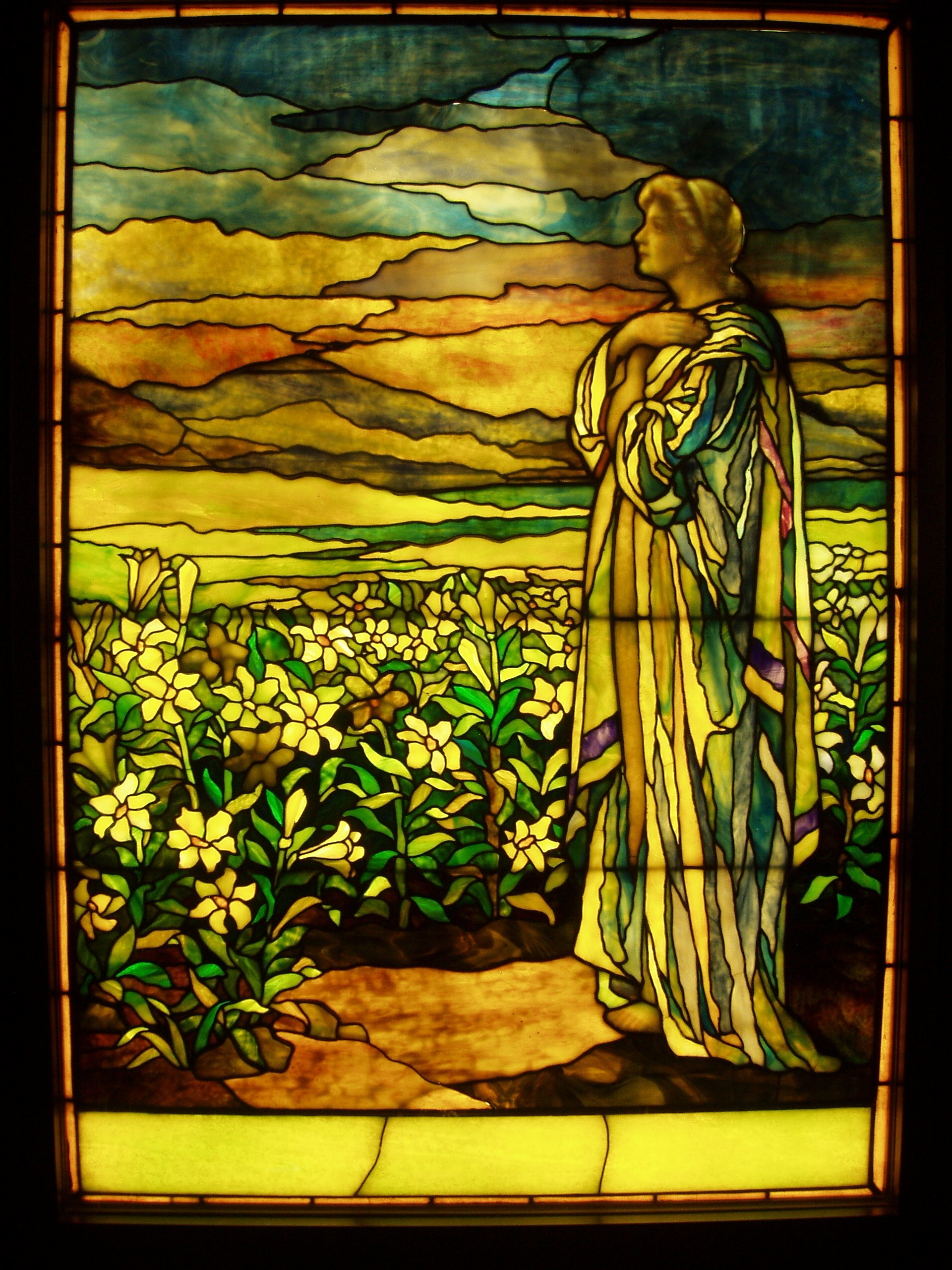
Hosea 14:5 Field of Lilies - Tiffany Studios, c. 1910.

== Verse 1 ==
Return, O Israel, to the Lord your God,

for you have stumbled because of your iniquity.

- "You have stumbled": from Hebrew ka-shalta, "fallen due to a false step".

== Verse 9 ==
Who is wise, and he shall understand these things?

prudent, and he shall know them?

for the ways of the Lord are right,

and the just shall walk in them:

but the transgressors shall fall therein.

This epilogue sums up the whole previous teaching. The Jerusalem Bible treats it as a "later addition in the style of the wisdom literature". Only here Hosea uses the term "righteous", a "rare character" in his day.

- "The ways of the Lord": also called "the 'course' of His providence", as it is written, "His ways are judgment" in Deuteronomy 32:4 and Daniel 4:37; "God, His ways are perfect" in Psalm 18:30; "the Lord is righteous in all His ways, and holy in all His works" in Psalm 145:17; "Thy way is in the sea, and Thy paths in the great waters, and Thy footsteps are not known" in Psalm 77:19; "... these are parts of His ways, but how little a portion is heard of Him, and the thunder of His power who can understand?" Job 26:14; "who hath enjoined Him His way, and who can say, Thou hast wrought iniquity?" in Job 36:23.
- "But the transgressors shall fall therein": the "transgressors of the law of God", according to Kimchi's father, will "stumble in them and fall"; or as Jarchi and the Targum state, "they fall into hell, into ruin and destruction, because they walk not in them"; but the sense also seems as Christ himself, his ways and his word, his doctrines and his ordinances, be stumbling blocks to wicked men, at which they stumble, and fall, and perish; see Luke 2:34 and Romans 9:33.
- In contrast, Wellhausen's "well-known reconstruction" of 14.9 is

Was hat Ephraim noch mit den Götzen?

ich bin seine Anath und seine Aschera,

ich bin ihm wie eine grüne Cypresse

bei mir finder sich seine Frucht.

== See also ==
- Ashur, the grandson of Noah in Genesis
- Ephraim
- Israel
- Lebanon
- Related Bible parts: Deuteronomy 4, Psalm 111, Proverbs 1, Hosea 13

== Notes ==
.

== Sources ==
- Collins, John J. (2014). Introduction to the Hebrew Scriptures. Fortress Press. ISBN 9781451469233.
- Day, John (2007). "27. Hosea". In Barton, John; Muddiman, John (eds.). The Oxford Bible Commentary (first (paperback) ed.). Oxford University Press. pp. 571–578. ISBN 978-0199277186.
- Fitzmyer, Joseph A. (2008). A Guide to the Dead Sea Scrolls and Related Literature. Grand Rapids, MI: William B. Eerdmans Publishing Company. ISBN 9780802862419.
- Hayes, Christine (2015). Introduction to the Bible. Yale University Press. ISBN 978-0300188271.
- Ulrich, Eugene, ed. (2010). The Biblical Qumran Scrolls: Transcriptions and Textual Variants. Brill.
- Würthwein, Ernst (1995). The Text of the Old Testament. Translated by Rhodes, Erroll F. Grand Rapids, MI: Wm. B. Eerdmans. ISBN 0-8028-0788-7.
