= Mari bar Rachel =

Rav Mari bar Rachel bat Shmuel, also known as Mari Breh deBat Shmuel, was a Babylonian rabbi from the third and fourth generations of amoraim.

== Biography ==
Unusually, his name mentions his mother, Rachel, and her father, Samuel of Nehardea, rather than his own father. The accepted explanation for this is that his mother was taken captive by non-Jews, and in captivity became pregnant via a Babylonian soldier later known as Issur Giura ("Issur the convert"), who then converted to Judaism before Mari was born. The Talmud discusses the status of a person with such ancestry, concluding that he is completely Jewish, even to the extent that he is permitted to take positions of authority which would be denied to one without a Jewish father.

A different Talmudic passage asserts that Mari's father was a Jew named Rava. To reconcile the contradiction, the Talmud concludes that "there were two Rav Mari bar Rachels", with the different passages referring to different individuals. However, Rashi and Tosafot to the passage argue that both the descent from Rava, and the explanation that there were two Maris, are not from the original Talmudic text, but rather are an erroneous later addition. In fact, according to them, there was only one Mari, and his father was Issur Giura.
