= Abaye =

Babylonian Jewish rabbi and Talmud scholar

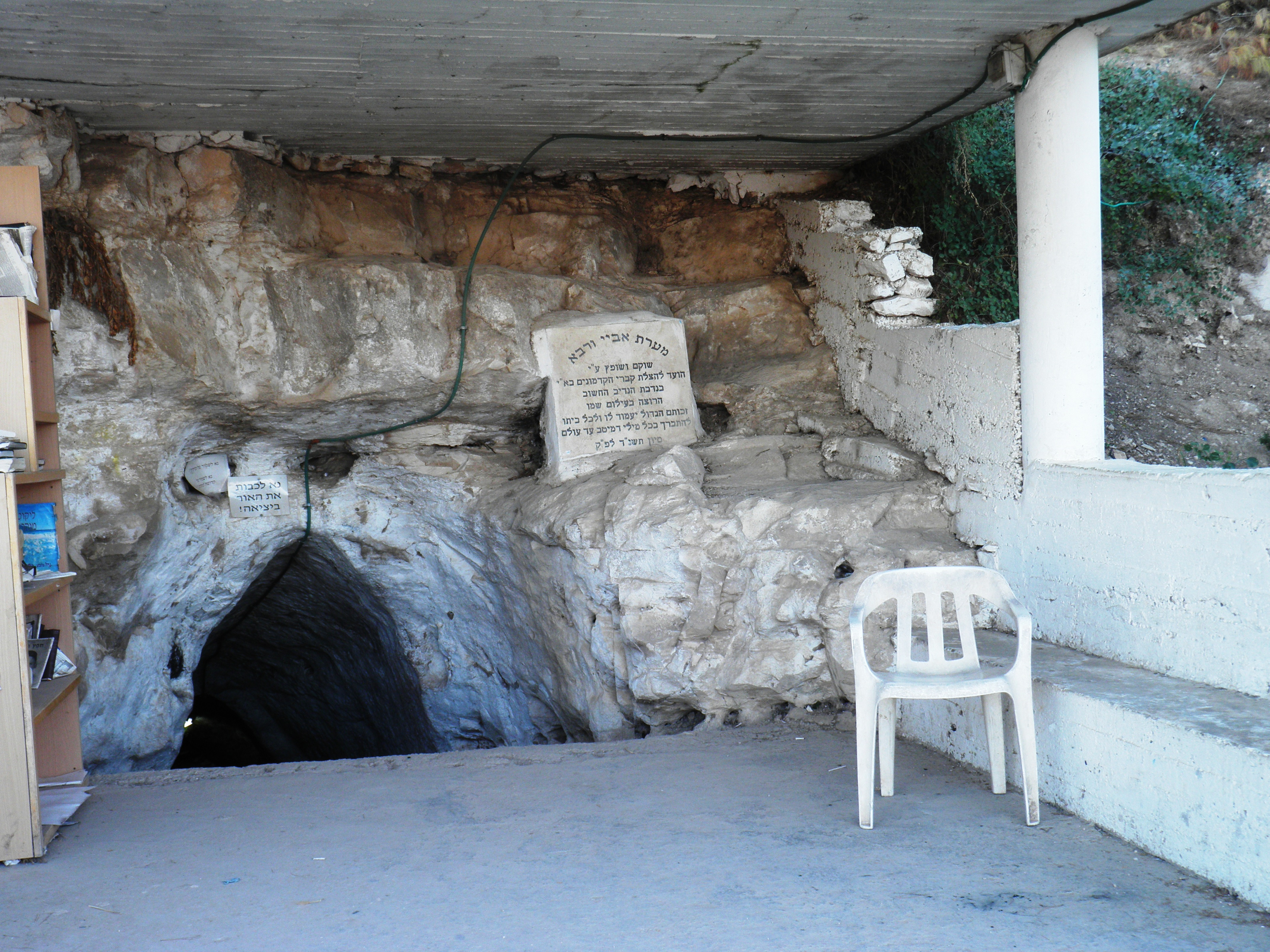
- Tomb of Abaye and Rava
- Born: Naḥmani c. 280; Lower Mesopotamia
- Died: 337; Lower Mesopotamia
- Burial place: Jamnith, Upper Galilee; 32°59′29″N 35°31′01″E
- Occupations: Rabbi, Talmudist
- Known for: Talmudic scholar and amora of the fourth generation
- Notable work: Head of the Pumbedita Academy

Abaye (or Abbaye) (Jewish Babylonian Aramaic: אַבַּיֵי, romanized: abbayē) was an amora of the fourth generation of the Talmudic academies in Babylonia. He was born about the close of the third century and died in 337.

== Biography ==
Abbaye, according to Talmudic tradition, was the rosh yeshiva (academic head) of Pumbedita Academy until his death. He was known as a modest and honest man, supporting himself through farming. He lived most of his life in poverty. Abbaye was born as the only son of Kilil. His father died before Abbaye was born, and his mother died during childbirth; he was adopted by his uncle, Rabbah bar Nahmani.

Abbaye was a descendant of Eli, upon whose descendants it was decreed that they would die young. Abbaye lived about sixty years according to Rosh Hashanah 18a.

=== His name ===
Abbaye was often called "Nahmani" by his friends. According to one opinion, first mentioned by Rashi in his commentary on Gittin 34b, he was called Nahmani because he was raised by bar Nahmani. According to another opinion, his original name was actually Nahmani. To avoid confusion with the name of his adoptive father, he was given the nickname Abbaye, which is a Hebrew abbreviation of the verse Hosea 14:4. The Maharsha explained this in Kiddushin in the name of the Abraham Zacuto, as did Isaac Luria in the Shaar HaGilgulim.

In contrast, Meir Abulafia at the end of Horayot suggests he was called Abbaye because the name resembles the word Abba 'father', implying "his name is like his father's name." Another modern theory suggests that Abbaye is an Aramaic word meaning 'comfort'. Thus, the name Abbaye is actually the Syrian version of the name Nahmani. The Talmud mentions that even in Heaven, he was called "Nahmani" in Pesachim 112b.

=== His childhood and teachers ===
His main teachers were Rabbah bar Nahmani and Rav Yosef bar Hiyya, a great amora of the 3rd generation. Abbaye was with them all their lives.

It is said that when Rav Yosef fell ill and forgot his learning, Abbaye would remind him. Abbaye greatly respected his teachers to the extent that it was said about him that when he saw the "ear of Rav Yosef's donkey approaching," he would rise in his honour.

Abbaye was particularly concerned with maintaining connections with the Talmudic academies in Syria Palaestina and with studying their teachings, thereby integrating the rulings of Johanan bar Nappaha into the Babylonian Talmud. Even in his youth, his talents were evident, as recorded in Berakhot 48a:

Abbaye and Rava were sitting before Rabbah. Rabbah asked them: To whom do we bless? They replied: To the Merciful (God). And where does the Merciful reside? Rava pointed to the ceiling; Abbaye went outside and pointed to the sky. Rabbah said to them: Both of you will become sages—as people say: 'Every gourd, when it begins to grow, one can already tell what will come of it.'

As Abbaye grew, he became known as a peacemaker and engaged in acts of kindness, thereby earning the trust and respect of the people.

Abbaye greatly appreciated his stepmother, and he often quoted her, adding the phrase "My mother told me," such as in Yoma 78b.

=== His friends ===
He was known for his disputes with Rava. However, there were also instances in which Abbaye supported Rava's opinion or explained it, and in approximately thirty places the Gemara states, "Abbaye and Rava both said..." Except for six cases, the law always follows Rava in their disputes. More than four thousand sayings, questions, contradictions, and answers are attributed to them, and almost no topic in the Talmud was left unexplored by them. The phrase "The Discussions of Abbaye and Rava" became synonymous with the entire Talmud.

Among his friends was Rav Shimi bar Ashi. He was close to Abbaye and transmitted some of his teachings that were not stated in the study hall but explained to his sons during their lessons in Yoma 27a and Kiddushin 48b. However, he was not considered a disciple of either Abbaye or Rava, as he often debated with them on matters of law, and occasionally disagreed with them.

=== As the Head of the Academy ===
Besides Rava, Abbaye was also a friend of Rabbi Zeira, one of the great sages of the generation who, according to Talmudic tradition, chose Abbaye as the head of the academy after the death of Rav Yosef. According to this tradition, four students competed for the position of rosh yeshiva, and it was decided that the one who would present an unrefutable argument would be chosen. It was Abbaye who prevailed, surpassing even Rava. It is also said that while Rava received a heavenly voice only on the eve of Yom Kippur, Abbaye received it every Friday, and Abba Ummana received it every day according to Taanit 21b.

Abbaye led the academy and the entire Babylonian Jewry for 14 years.

He also served as a judge, and Bava Batra 166a recounts how he identified document forgers based on their writing style.

=== Bar Hedya and the Dreams of Abbaye and Rava ===
During the time of Abbaye and Rava, there was a man named Bar Hedya who worked as a dream interpreter. It is said that he would interpret dreams favourably for those who paid him and unfavourably for those who did not. Abbaye would pay him, whereas Rava would not, leading Bar Hedya to interpret Abbaye's dreams favourably and Rava's unfavourably. Berakhot 56a recounts a series of such dreams.

For example, Abbaye and Rava said to him: We saw in our dream the verse 'Your ox shall be slain before your eyes, and you shall not eat thereof." (Deuteronomy 28:31). Bar Hedya interpreted it for Rava as a loss in business, causing such sorrow that he would not eat, and for Abbaye as a gain in business, making him so joyful he could not eat.

== Family ==
His first wife bore him sons and daughters, but no further details about her are known.

According to Yevamot 64b, his second wife was Homa, the great-granddaughter of Judah bar Ezekiel , whose two previous husbands had died. In the dispute among the sages about whether a woman is considered hazaka after the death of two husbands or only after three, Abaye relied on Yitzchak bar Yosef, who ruled that the hazaka is only after three occurrences, and he married Homa. He too later died.

One of Abaye's sons was the well-known amora Bevai bar Abaye.

== Burial place ==
Regarding his burial place, Rabbi Chaim Vital wrote in Sefer HaGilgulim:

"In the village of Yavnit there is a cave where Abaye and Rava are buried. The entrance faces west, and inside there are many chambers. In the southern-eastern corner is the chamber where Abaye is buried. The adjacent chamber to the south is where Rav Dimi of Nehardea is buried. The next chamber to the south, which is wider than Rav Dimi’s chamber, is where Rava is buried. It is the middle chamber on the southern side; the other chambers were not identified."

== Teachings ==
Hullin 121b recounts that there is a law that if a utensil is ingested within a living person or animal, even if the person or animal is inside an ohel, the impure object does not become impure through the impurity of the enclosure. The amora Zeira raised a question about whether a utensil inside a convulsing animal is considered ingested because the animal is not dead. Sheshet ruled that the animal is not considered ingested because it is considered "food," but Zeira questioned this, asking how it could be considered "dead" given the law that such an animal does not transmit carcass impurity. Rashi explains that the question is only relevant for a Jew who has utensils inside an impure animal or a gentile who has utensils inside a pure animal. However, if a Jew has utensils inside a pure animal permitted for consumption, it is clear that the utensils are not considered ingested, because the animal is permitted for consumption, and anything ingested within food is not considered ingested. The question only pertains to an impure animal, which is forbidden for consumption, and whether it should be viewed as alive since it does not transmit carcass impurity or as food since it transmits food impurity. Abaye ruled stringently, considering both statuses (life and death); therefore, the animal does not protect what is inside it, but one who commits bestiality with it incurs capital punishment if done intentionally and with knowledge, and a sin offering if done unintentionally, as it is still considered alive.

== Modern application ==
Abaye's dicta continue to inform contemporary practice. His remark that “the world endures only for the breath of school‑children” (Shabbat 119b) is widely quoted by educators as the classic Talmudic basis for prioritising early Torah study; the Lubavitcher Rebbe invoked the same passage in advocating universal Jewish day‑schools. Abaye's practice of serving a meal whenever someone completed a tractate (Shabbat 118b) underpins the present‑day Siyum ceremony that halakhic sources classify as a Seudat mitzvah; the Rebbe recommended public siyumim even during the Nine Days to introduce “constructive joy” into that mournful period. Finally, Abaye's observation in Moed Katan 28a that surviving to age 60 removes the penalty of Kareth is the textual source for celebrating a sixtieth birthday with thanksgiving, a milestone the Rebbe framed as a call for renewed public service rather than retirement.

== See also ==
- Yeiush
