= Rav Nachman =

Babylonian rabbi

Rav Nachman bar Yaakov
- רב נחמן בר יעקב
- Title: Rabbi, Amora

Personal life
- Born: Babylonia
- Died: 320
- Spouse: Yalta
- Known for: Talmudic scholar, chief justice

Religious life
- Religion: Judaism
- Institute: Yeshiva at Nehardea

Senior posting
- Teacher: Samuel of Nehardea, Rabbah bar Abuha

Rav Nachman bar Yaakov (Hebrew: רב נחמן בר יעקב; died 320 CE) was a prominent Jewish Talmudic sage (Amora) of the third generation, who lived in Babylonia. He is generally identified with the figure referred to simply as Rav Nachman in the Babylonian Talmud. He was married to Yalta, who is mentioned several times in Talmudic literature.

It is generally accepted that references to Rav Nachman in the Talmud refer to Rav Nachman bar Yaakov, not to Rav Nachman bar Yitzchak.

== Biography ==
Rav Nachman studied under Samuel of Nehardea and Rabbah bar Abuha. He served as the chief justice (dayan) under the authority of the exilarch—the political leader of Babylonian Jewry—and later became head of the academy in Nehardea. Following the destruction of Nehardea, he relocated his students to Shekanẓib.

Through his marriage to a daughter of the Exilarch's family, Rav Nachman gained access to material wealth, which enabled him to host scholars and guests generously. When Rabbi Yitzchak of Palestine visited Babylonia, he stayed at Rav Nachman's home and, upon departing, blessed him with a parable likening his host to a tree that provides shade, fruit, and water. Rabbi Yitzchak concluded by saying:

“Just as this tree needs no blessing, for it already provides generously, so may all that grows from you be like you.”

According to the Talmud, Rav Nachman is described as a capable and respected judge, known for both decisiveness and humility. He is quoted as saying:

"Let the Messiah come, and I will be privileged to sit in the shadow of his donkey’s excrement. I am willing to undergo all the pain and disgrace associated with his arrival."

Similarly, Rav Nachman already possessed Torah, wealth, and children; so Rav Yitzchak blessed him that his offspring would also be like him.

Due to his recognized expertise, he occasionally issued rulings in civil law cases independently, without consulting colleagues—a practice permitted to someone deemed an "expert for the public." When Rav Yehuda overturned one of his rulings, Rav Nachman is recorded to have responded:

"Did a child tear it up? A great man tore it up; he must have found reason to invalidate it."

== Teachings ==
Rav Nachman contributed significantly to important halakhic principles. He ruled that a defendant who categorically denies liability must take the rabbinical oath (Shevu'at Hesset), even without additional proof from the claimant. He also articulated the legal principle of avad inish dina lenafsheih ("a person may act to enforce judgment for themselves"), permitting limited self-help in monetary disputes before court adjudication.

In addition to legal rulings, Rav Nachman engaged extensively with aggadic traditions. He drew from multiple narrative collections and often grouped together Aramaic aphorisms in his teachings. His style favored the use of popular, colloquial expressions, and many of his homiletic remarks about Biblical figures use accessible imagery.

Examples of his aggadic commentary include:

- “It is unbecoming for women to be conceited; even Deborah and Huldah bore unflattering names—‘bee’ and ‘weasel’.”
- “Impudence can be effective even toward Heaven: initially, God told Balaam ‘Do not go,’ but after persistence, said, ‘Go with them.’”
- “Sinful thoughts harm a person more than the sin itself.”
