= Rava (amora) =

Babylonian Jewish Talmudist

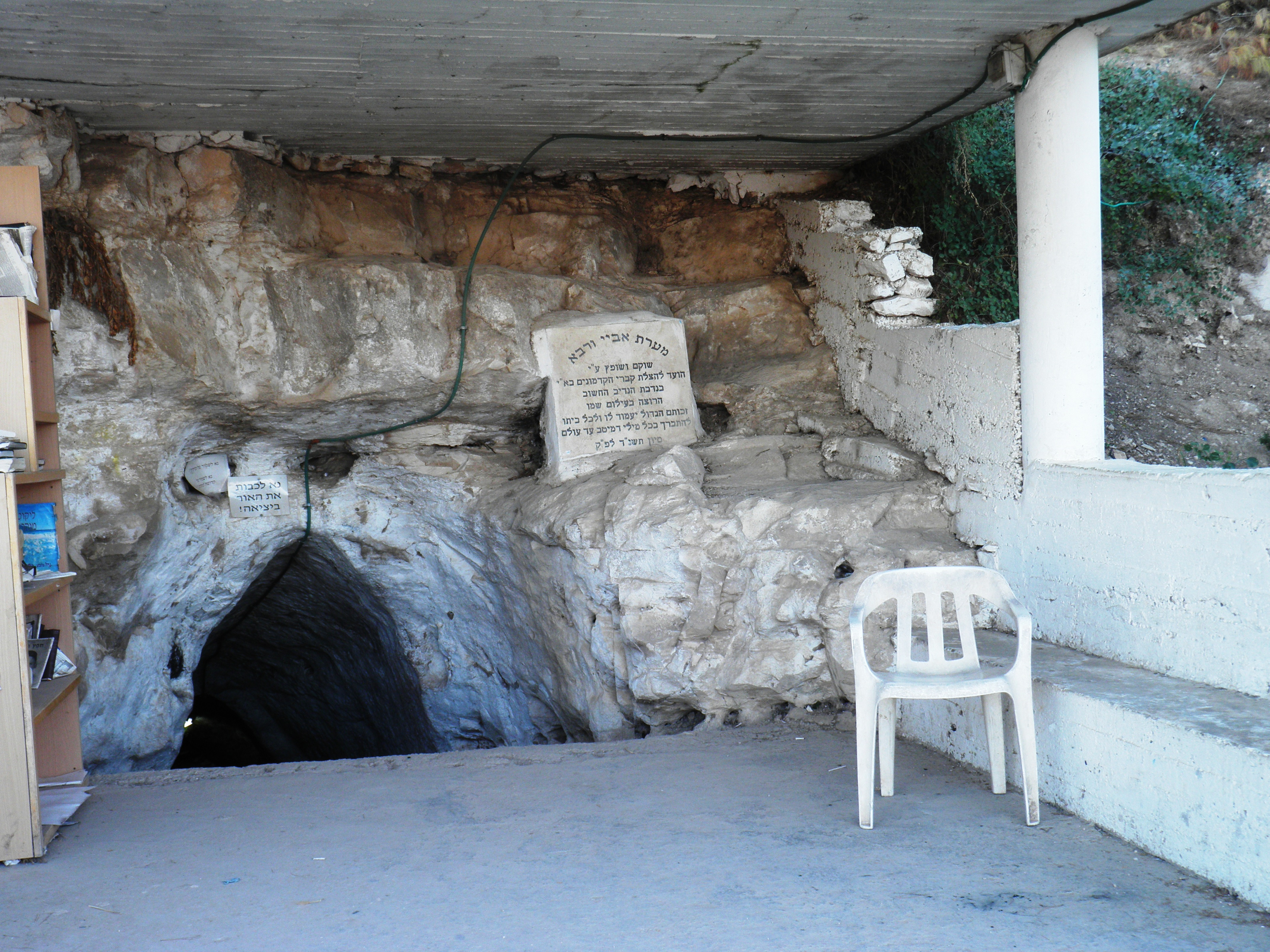
- Alleged tomb of Abaye and Rava
- Born: Abba ben Joseph bar Ḥama c. 280; Mahoza, Babylonia
- Died: 352; Mahoza, Babylonia
- Burial place: Har Yavnit, Upper Galilee; 32°59′29″N 35°31′01″E
- Occupations: Talmudist, Rabbi
- Known for: Debates with Abaye, numerous citations in the Talmud
- Notable work: Head of the Talmudic Academy of Mahoza

Abba ben Joseph bar Ḥama (c. 280 – 352 CE), who is exclusively referred to in the Talmud by the name Rava (רבא), was a Babylonian rabbi who belonged to the fourth generation of amoraim. He is known for his debates with Abaye, and is one of the most often cited rabbis in the Talmud.

== Biography ==
He was born about 280 CE in Mahoza (a suburb of Ctesiphon, the capital of Persia), where his father was a wealthy and distinguished scholar. In his youth Rava went to Sura, where he attended the lectures of Rav Chisda and associated with Rami bar Hama. About ten years after Rami's death Rava married his widow, the Rav Chisda's daughter. It is said that earlier Rav Chisda's daughter sat in her father's classroom, while his students, Rava and Rami bar Hama, stand before them. When Rav Chisda asked her which of the two she wants to marry, she replied "both of them," and Rava added, "I'll be the last one" (commentators let us know that she indeed married Rami first and Rava second). They had five sons, the eldest of whom, Yoseph, died during his parents' lifetime.

Rava studied at the Talmudic Academy of Pumbedita, now Falluja, Iraq. Rava's teachers were Rav Yosef bar Hiyya, Rabbah, and, chiefly, Rav Nachman, who lived in Mahoza. His chief study companion was Abaye, who was about the same age, and both of them developed the dialectic method which Judah bar Ezekiel and their teacher Rabbah had established in their discussions of tradition; their debates became known as the Havayot de-Abaye ve-Rava.

Rava enjoyed the special protection of the mother of Shapur II, the tenth Sasanian emperor according to Ta'anit 24b, who calls her "Ifra Hormiz" (אִיפְרָא הוֹרְמִיז). For this reason, and in consideration of the large sums which he secretly contributed to the court noted in Hagiga 5b, he succeeded in making less severe Shapur's oppressions of the Jews in Babylonia.

When, after the death of Rav Yosef, Abaye was chosen head of the Academy of Pumbedita (Horayot 14a), Rava founded a school of his own in Mahoza. Many pupils, preferring Rava's lectures to Abaye's lectures, followed Rava to Mahoza. After Abaye's death Rava was elected head of the school, and the academy was transferred from Pumbedita to Mahoza, which, during the lifetime of Rava, was the only seat of Jewish learning in Babylonia.

According to Sherira Gaon, Rava died in 352 CE. Some texts of the Talmud say that he died at age 40, being one of the descendants of Eli who were cursed with early death; but in all likelihood the correct version of the text refers to Rabbah not Rava.

== Burial site ==
Jewish tradition holds that Rava and his study companion Abaye are buried in a cave shown on Har Yavnit (Ovnit). R. Yudan Nesi'ah, upon whom was conferred the title of nasi, is also said to have been buried on the mountain, along with his two sons. Visitors may access the burial sites as they lie outside the restricted area. The mountain affords a good prospect of the Hula Valley on its east and southeastern side, including the town of Rosh Pina and the northern part of the Sea of Galilee.

== Teachings ==
=== Halacha ===
The debates between Rava and Abaye are considered classic examples of Talmudic dialectical logic. Of their hundreds of recorded disputes, the law is decided according to the opinion of Rava in all but six cases. His methodology greatly influenced not only his students, but the stammaim, as well. Rava was regarded as a greater authority than Abaye, and in cases where there was a difference of opinion between them Rava was generally followed; there are only six instances in which Abaye's decision was preferred. Rava "would join the practical awareness of daily existence" to his teachings, while Abaye's teachings relied only on "the consistent and systematic logic of halakhic interpretation"; thus halakha was decided like Rava in nearly all cases.

Rava occupied a prominent position among the transmitters of halakhah, and established many new decisions and rulings, especially in ceremonial law. He strove to spread the knowledge of halakhah by discoursing upon it in lectures, to which the public were admitted, and many of his halakhic decisions expressly state that they were taken from such discourses. He was a master of halakhic exegesis, not infrequently resorting to it to demonstrate the Biblical authority underlying legal regulations. He adopted certain hermeneutic principles which were partly modifications of older rules and partly his own. One example of a rule he likely invented is Maimonides' rule, which the eponymous Maimonides would later cite and popularise in the Mishneh Torah.

Rava apparently had to reply to a deep-seated skepticism toward rabbinic authority and to defend the authenticity of the rabbinic oral tradition. The skepticism of Mahozan Jewry was fueled in part by the acceptance of the Manichaean polemic against Zoroastrianism and its insistence on oral transmission, and by a strong concern with the problem of theodicy, encouraged by a familiarity with Zoroastrian theology. Rava's creativity was fueled by his cosmopolitan urban environment. For instance, he ruled that one who habitually ate certain non-kosher foods because he liked the taste was nevertheless trustworthy as a witness in cases involving civil matters. So too did he suggest that a lost object belongs to the person who discovers it even before the loser is aware of his loss, because it prevented the loser from resorting to urban courts to try to get his property back and eliminated the period of uncertainty of possession. It also led to the legal concept that 'future [psychological] abandonment [of possession] when unaware [of the loss] is [nevertheless retrospectively accounted] as abandonment'. Ultimately, Rava's views were decisive in shaping the Bavli's approach to the problem of theodicy, legal midrash, and conceptualization, all of which stand in stark contrast to the Yerushalmi."

=== Aggadah ===
Rava was as preeminent in aggadah as in halakhah. In addition to the lectures to his pupils, he used to hold public discourses, most of them aggadic in character, and many of his aggadic interpretations are expressly said to have been delivered in public. Even more numerous are the interpretations which, although not expressly stated to have been delivered in public, seem to have been presented before a general audience, since they do not differ from the others in form. The majority of these expositions, which frequently contain popular maxims and proverbs, refer to the first books of the Ketuvim—Psalms, Proverbs, Job, Song of Songs, and Ecclesiastes.

Bacher justly infers from this that the aggadic lectures of Rava were delivered in connection with the Sabbath afternoon service—at which, according to a custom observed in Nehardea, and later probably in Mahoza also, parashiyyot were read from the Ketuvim. Rava therefore appended his aggadic discourse to the Biblical section which had been read.

Torah study is a frequent topic of Rava's aggadah. In the judgment after death, each man will be obliged to state whether he devoted certain times to study, and whether he diligently pursued the knowledge of the Law, striving to deduce the meaning of one passage from another. The Torah, in his view, is a medicine, life-giving to those who devote themselves to it with right intent, but a deadly poison for those who do not properly avail themselves of it. "A true disciple of wisdom must be upright; and his interior must harmonize with his exterior". Rava frequently emphasizes the respect due to teachers of the Law, the proper methods of study, and the rules applicable to the instruction of the young. In addition, Rava's aggadah frequently discusses the characters of Biblical history.

=== Mysticism ===
Rava was secretly initiated, probably by his teacher Rav Yosef, into aggadic esoterism; a number of his teachings are tinged with mysticism. It is said that he once created a golem and sent it to Rav Zeira. Once, he wished to lecture in the academy upon the Tetragrammaton, but an old man prevented him, reminding him that such knowledge must be kept secret.

=== Quotes ===
- The reward for [learning] tradition is its logic [not the practical conclusions].
- Either companionship or death. (popular saying)
- When as yet I had not been made, I was not worthy. But now that I have been made, it is as though I had not been made. Dust am I during my lifetime, how more than in my death!
- A candle for one is a candle for a hundred.

== See also ==
- Yeiush
