= Rav Yosef bar Hiyya =

Babylonian rabbi

- רב יוסף בר חייא
- Title: Rabbi, Amora

Personal life
- Flourished: 3rd century
- Known for: Head of the Pumbedita Academy

Religious life
- Religion: Judaism

Senior posting
- Teacher: Judah bar Ezekiel
- Students: Abaye, Rava

Rav Yosef bar Hiyya (Hebrew: רב יוסף בר חייא), or simply Rav Yosef, was a Babylonian rabbi of the third generation of amoraim.

== Biography ==
Yosef was a student of Judah bar Ezekiel and was Abaye's teacher, and a scholarly disputant (bar plugata) of Rabbah bar Nahmani. When his teacher Judah died, Yosef was expected to take Judah's place as the gaon of the Pumbedita Academy, due to his excellent knowledge of rabbinic law (as opposed to Rabbah, who excelled in analysis rather than knowledge). Yosef, however, refused to take the position. Rabbah took it instead at the age of 18 and held it until his death at the age of 40. At this point, Yosef agreed to become head of the academy. He held this position for two years, until he died.

Yosef was accustomed to recite a sermon on Shabbat before the mussaf prayer.

Despite being blind, Yosef managed to accumulate an exceptional knowledge of both written and Oral Torah. When some of the canonical Biblical translations were forgotten, he managed to restore them from his memory. However, at one point he contracted a disease which caused him to forget his studies. With the help of his main student, Abaye, he was then able to reconstruct his knowledge.

He was greatly respected by his students Rava and Abaye.

He is recorded as speaking, paradoxically, of his humility: "[A tanna recited:] Since Rabbi died, there is no more humility or fear of sin [in the world]. Rav Yosef said to him: Do not teach this regarding humility, for there is still me."
