= Sassoon (name) =

Sassoon as a name may refer to:

== Surname ==
Sassoon family, a Jewish business family originating in Baghdad, Iraq, including:

- David Sassoon (David Ben Sassoon) (1792–1864)
  - Sir Albert Abdullah David Sassoon (1818–1896), 1st Baronet of Kensington Gore, married Hannah Moses, daughter of Meyer Moses.
    - Flora (Farha) Abraham (1856–1936), married Solomon David Sassoon (1841–1894) (see below)
  - Sir Edward Sassoon (1856–1912), 2nd Baronet of Kensington Gore.
    - Sir Philip Sassoon (1888–1939), 3rd Baronet of Kensington Gore
    - Sybil Cholmondeley, Marchioness of Cholmondeley (1894–1989)
  - Elias David Sassoon (1820–1880), businessman
    - Jacob Elias Sassoon (1844–1916), first Baronet
    - Sir Edward Elias Sassoon (1853–1924), 2nd Baronet of Bombay
      - Sir Victor Sassoon (Ellice) (1881–1961), 3rd Baronet
  - Sassoon David Sassoon (1832–1867), British Indian merchant
          - James Sassoon (born 1955), British businessman and government minister.
      - Siegfried Sassoon (1886–1967), English poet.
        - George Sassoon (1936–2006), English scientist, electronic engineer, linguist, translator and author.
  - Reuben David Sassoon (1835–1905), English businessman.
  - Arthur Sassoon (1840–1912), English banker and socialite
  - Solomon David Sassoon (1841–1894)
      - David Suleiman Sassoon (1880–1942) married Selina Sophie Prins, a granddaughter of Eliezer Liepman Philip Prins
      - Rabbi Solomon David Sassoon (1915–1985), Talmudic scholar and writer
        - Rabbi Isaac S.D. Sassoon, Sephardic Orthodox rabbi
  - Frederick David Sassoon (1853–1917), married the daughter of Edward L. Raphael.

Not part of the above family tree:

- Danielle Sassoon, American former acting US Attorney for the Southern District of New York
- David Sassoon (designer) (1932–2025), British high-end fashion designer
- Kathryn Harrison (born 1961), American writer, descended from the Sassoon family via her grandmother
- Rosemary Sassoon (born 1931), creator of the Sassoon series of typefaces
- Vidal Sassoon (1928–2012), English hairdresser and businessman
  - Catya Sassoon (1968–2002), American actress

== Given name ==
- Sassoon David Sassoon (1832–1867), British Indian merchant (see surname section above)
- Sassoon Eskell (1860–1932), Iraqi statesman and financier regarded in Iraq as the Father of Parliament
- Sir Sassoon David, 1st Baronet (1849–1926), Iraqi-born Indian businessman and statesman

== See also ==
- Sassoon (disambiguation)
