= Nathan ben Abraham I =

11th century commentator on the Mishnah

Rabbi Nathan ben Abraham
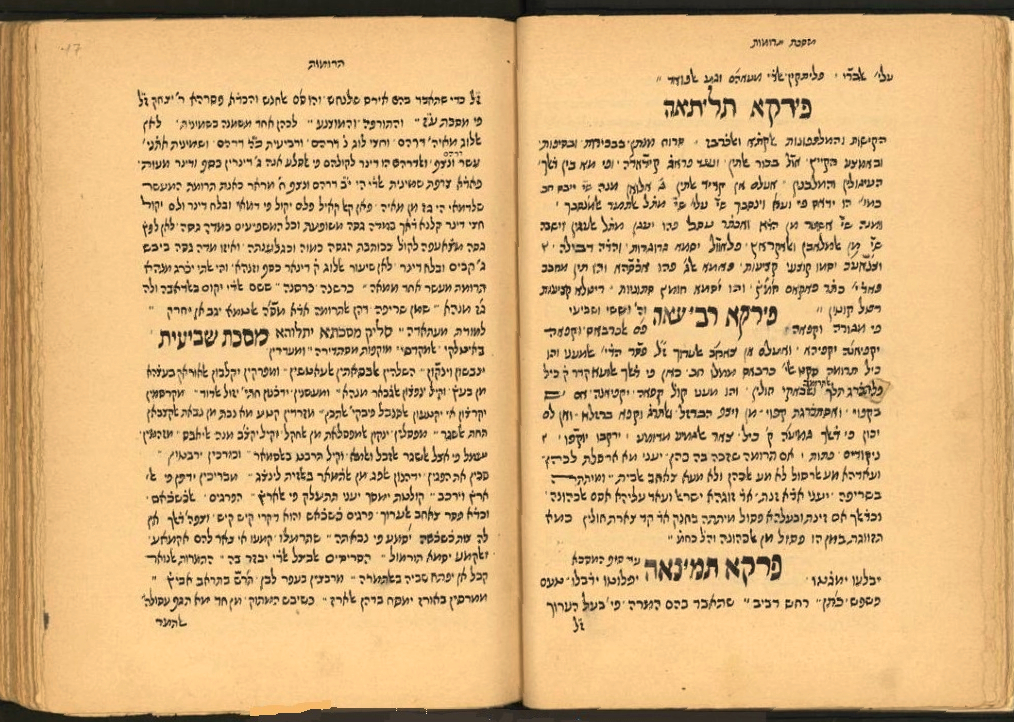
- Mishnah Commentary of Rabbi Nathan
- Title: President of the Academy

Personal life
- Born: נתן בן אברהם late 10th century CE Jund Filastin district, Bilad al-Sham province, Fatimid Caliphate
- Died: circa 1051 CE Jund Filastin district, Bilad al-Sham province, Fatimid Caliphate
- Buried: unknown
- Parent: Abraham (father)

Religious life
- Religion: Judaism
- Profession: Rabbi

Jewish leader
- Position: Av Beit Din
- Residence: Ramleh

Nathan ben Abraham, known also by the epithet President of the Academy (Hebrew: רבינו נתן אב הישיבה) in the Land of Israel (died ca. 1045 – 1051), was an 11th-century rabbi and exegete of the Mishnah who lived in Ramla, in the Jund Filastin district of the Fatimid Caliphate. He was the author of the first known commentary covering the entire Mishnah.

== Biography ==
A critical analysis of the time-frame in which the author of the Judeo-Arabic Mishnah commentary lived places him in the early 11th century. Assaf suggests that he was Rabbi Nathan the second, the son of Rabbi Abraham who was called the Pious, a contemporary of Rabbi Abiathar, who served in the geonate of the Land of Israel in 1095 CE. This view has been rejected by more recent scholars, such as Gil (1983), Friedman (1990), Danzig (1998), Amar (2011) and Fox (1994), who put him two generations earlier. In around 1011, Nathan travelled to Qayrawan, to attend to his family inheritance, and while there he studied under the illustrious Rabbi Hushiel ben Elhanan, one of the greatest Jewish scholars of the time. During this time he would travel to Fustat (Old Cairo), in Egypt, where he had certain business engagements, and where it was that he'd meet his future wife, the daughter of Mevorakh ben Eli, a wealthy citizen of Fustat. Nearing the age of forty, he returned to his native Palestine and, after settling in Ramleh where he vied with the Gaon Solomon ben Judah of Jerusalem between the years 1038 and 1051 over the position of gaon, he was eventually appointed the Av Beit Din (President of the court) in Palestine, a position only second to that of the gaon, and which post he held until his death. During his years of public service, Rabbi Nathan had garnered the support and backing of Diaspora communities, although Solomon ben Judah had secured the backing of the local community, as well as the Fatimid governor of Ramleh. In Palestine, he compiled a commentary on the Mishnah, which commentary enjoyed widespread circulation in the Jewish world in the late 12th and early 13th centuries.

== Commentary ==
Rabbi Nathan's work is one of the first known commentaries of the Mishnah, ranking with that of Rabbi Hai Gaon's commentary on Seder Taharot in the Mishnah (and is the oldest existing commentary encompassing the entire Six Orders of the Mishnah). Scholars have ascribed this commentary a unique significance, saying that by virtue of its composition in the Land of Israel, its interpretations are believed to embody an unbroken Palestinian-Jewish tradition on the meanings of difficult words. The treatise also sheds light on the diachrony of Hebrew words.

The entire work was rendered into a Hebrew translation by Rabbi Yosef Qafih, with an abridged first edition being published between the years 1955 and 1958, and the second edition in 1965. Even so, the work has not seen widespread circulation.

=== Anonymous copyist ===
Nathan's original Judeo-Arabic commentary of the Mishnah served as the basis for a later recension made by a 12th-century anonymous author and copyist, believed to be of Yemenite Jewish provenance. It is doubtful that his work would have survived, had it not been for the faithful copyist, whose innovation was to interweave in the existing text the divergent views held by several geonim and the explanations given by them for words and passages in the Mishnah. The author's introduction reads: "I found the commentaries of Rabbi Nathan, the President of the Academy, [which he made] for explicating the different language usages in the Mishnah, and I have seen fit to add thereto others besides, drawn from the commentaries of Israel's sages." The anonymous copyist is said to have lived between 1105 – 1170 CE, making him a contemporary with Rabbi Isaac Alfasi and Nathan ben Jehiel of Rome, the author of Sefer Arukh. He is the first to introduce the work as being a commentary of the Mishnah, written by "Rabbeinu Nathan, Av ha-Yeshiva" (the President of the Academy), whom he calls "the son of Abraham ha-Ḥasīd" (Abraham the Pious). This last epithet is believed to have been an error by the copyist, who mistook its true author, Nathan ben Abraham (of the 11th century), with Nathan ben Abraham II, the grandson of the former. He then proceeds to bring down a long introduction wherein he spans the history of the written and oral Laws, writing in Judeo-Arabic and commencing with the words, qāl ğāmiʿuh (= "So said the gatherer [of the sayings of the fathers]," etc.), covering the Torah's reception at Sinai and how it was transmitted down throughout successive generations, naming some thirteen generations from the time of Israel's return from the Babylonian exile to the time of Rabbi Judah HaNasi who compiled the Mishnah in 189 CE. In all this, he never once mentions his own name, but chooses to remain anonymous. He also explains some of the terminology used in the Talmud, such as when a saying is meant to be understood as an external teaching (Baraitta) outside of the Mishnah, and when it is to be understood as a teaching strictly derived from the Mishnah compiled by Rabbi Judah HaNasi. He then mentions the redaction of the Babylonian Talmud under Rav Ashi as occurring in the year 841 of Seleucid era (corresponding with 530 CE), and names the great exegetes that followed this period, namely: the author of Halakhot Ḳetu'ot and Halakhot Pesuḳot, Rabbi Yehudai Gaon; the author of Halakhot Gedolot, Rabbi Shimon Kiara; the author of the Beramot (a term applied to the book Sheëltot of Rav Aḥai, the Gaon of Shabḥa); Rabbi Hai Gaon; Rabbi Isaac ibn Ghiyyat of Lucena; Rabbi Nissim, the author of Sefer ha-Mafteaḥ, Rabbi Samuel ben Ḥofni, Rabbi Hananel, and Rabbi Isaac Alfasi. A certain book entitled Kitāb al-Ḥāwī ("the Compendium") is cited four times, composed by a certain R. David b. Saadiah.

Three of the author's more extensive commentaries exist for the tractates Berakhot, Shevu'ot and Avot. Since the anonymous copyist makes use of other sources in the original work bequeathed by Rabbi Nathan, it is not uncommon for him to give one explanation for a word in one tractate, but in a different tractate give a different explanation for the same word. The anonymous copyist deviated from the set order of the Mishnah, bringing down the order as follows: (Seder Zera'im) Berakhot, (Seder Mo'ed) 'Eruvin, Pesahim, Sheqalim, Kippurim, Sukkah, Betzah, Rosh Ha-Shannah, Ta'anith, Megillah, Hagiggah, Mo'ed Qatan, etc. Occasionally, the explanation given for a certain word or phrases found in one Mishnaic verse is explained by the author in one of the subsequent verses, such as the teaching about the dried figs and fig-cakes of Mishnah Terumah 2:4 being explained in Mishnah Terumah, chapter 3.

An early reference to Nathan ben Abraham's Mishnah commentary is brought down by Rabbi Moses ben Nahman (1194–1270), who cites the commentary in his own Talmudic commentary, saying: "Likewise, I found written in the glosses of old copies of the Mishnah composed in the Land of Israel where they explained the meaning of sippūq (Heb. ספוק) as having the connotation of adā, in the Arabic tongue, [meaning], he that grafts a tree upon a tree." The referent here is to Nathan's commentary in Tractate Orlah (1:5).

=== Vocabulary ===
Rabbi Nathan's method of elucidating Hebrew words is mostly similar to that of Maimonides' Mishnah commentary - the two often complementing each other, but differing in several key areas. A comparative study gives readers a glimpse into words that carried different connotations in that period, with occasional words whose identification can have a significant halachic bearing, depending on how they are explained. There are above one-hundred entries of plants mentioned in the Mishnah that have been identified by Rabbi Nathan. In some entries, two different explanations are given for one word, the one perhaps under the authority of another rabbinic sage.

Comparative study of Mishnaic words
| Mishnah | Hebrew Word | Nathan ben Abraham | Maimonides | Sefer Arukh | Hai Gaon |
|---|---|---|---|---|---|
| Kila'im 1:4 | אגסים | אלאנג'אץ; Pear (Pyrus syriaca) | אלאג'אץ “al-ağāṣ are commonly known among us under the name al-barqūq” Plum (Prunus domestica) | פיר"א; Pear (Pyrus syriaca) (Arabic: אגץ) | קומותרי (Arabic: kummathra); Pear (Pyrus communis) |
| Uktzin 2:2 | אזוב | אלצעתר; Marjoram (Majorana syriaca) | אלצעתר; Marjoram (Majorana syriaca) | אברתא בר המג (Aḇarta bar hemaj) | --- |
| Kila'im 5:8 | אירוס | אלחלק; Cissus spp. (a species of lianas) | אלסיסנבר; Mentha spp. | סוסימבר"ו (susimbro) | “a tree whose name in the Gallian tongue is erusa” (ארוסא) |
| Nedarim 6:8 (6:10) | אספרגוס | מי סלק (“Water in which chard has been steeped”) | “the water in which any vegetable has been boiled, especially Kale (Brassica oleracea var. acephala)” | “taken from the kinds of karūb (Brassica) which were steeped in wine and called by them asparagos” | “taken from the kinds of karūb (Brassica) which were steeped in wine and called by them asparagos” |
| Shabbat 21:3 | אפונין | אלחמץ; Chickpeas (Cicer arietinum) אלכשד Lablab bean (Lablab purpureus) | אלחֻמֻץ; Chickpeas (Cicer arietinum) | ציצירי; Chickpeas (Cicer arietinum) (Arabic: אלחמץ) | --- |
| Yoma 3:9 | אשכרוע | אלבקס; Boxwood (Buxus sempervirens) | אלבקס שמשאר; Boxwood (Buxus sempervirens) | פיקסונין; Boxwood (Buxus sempervirens) (Arabic: בקס) | פיקסי; Boxwood (Buxus sempervirens) |
| Shevi'it 7:2 | בוכריה | --- | “unknown herbs” | בנגר (banjar) beetroot (Beta vulgaris) | --- |
| Niddah 9:6 | בורית | אשנאן; Saltwort (Soda rosmarinus) | אלגאסול al-ghāsūl (alkali substance) | “its essence is from a plant” | זאתא (zātha [zitha]) |
| Shevi'it 5:1 | בנות שוח | אלמוז; Banana (Musa paradisiaca) אלג'מיז; Sycamore figs (Ficus sycomorus) | "a kind of sycamore fig" | "white figs" | --- |
| Demai 1:1 | בנות שקמה | אלגמיז; Sycamore fig (Ficus sycomorus) | אלג'מיז; Sycamore fig (Ficus sycomorus) | צילצי celce | --- |
| Demai 1:1 | גופנין | “vine plantings; grapes that are unfit for being made into raisins” | “a species of vegetables similar to dill, but there are those who say Assyrian plum” (Foeniculum vulgare) | “lambrusco; what appears at the end of the [grape] harvest” | --- |
| Kila'im 1:2 | דלעת מצרית | בטיך' אלחבשי; Cultivar of Cucumis melo | אלדלאע אלמצרי; Egyptian gourd | קיקיון; Castorbean plant (Ricinus communis) | --- |
| Kila'im 1:4 | חֻזרַד | אלענברוד; Pear (Pyrus spp.) | אלעיזראן; Medlar (Mespilus germanica) | חזרר “a kind of apple” | --- |
| Kila'im 1:2 | sing. חזרת pl. חזרים | אלכ'ס; Lettuce (Lactuca sativa) | אלכ'ס; Lettuce (Lactuca sativa) | לטוק"א; Lettuce (Lactuca sativa) | כ'ס; Lettuce (Lactuca sativa) |
| Shevi'it 7:2 | חלביצין | אלראזק (al-rāziq) | unidentified | "egg-shaped seeds that issue from the fennel (Ferula)" | --- |
| Shevi'it 9:1 | חלגלוגות | זהראת אלנבאת (zahrāt al-nebāt); Herbal flowers | “a kind of purslane whose leaves are large and whose stalk is long, being al-baqla al-ḥamqa” (Portulaca oleracea) | Arabic: אלפרפחין; Purslane (Portulaca oleracea) | Arabic: בזר רגלה “the seed of purslane” Purslane (Portulaca oleracea) |
| Uktzin 3:5 | חמס | ריחאן; Sweet Basil (Ocimum basilicum) | אלדארציני; Cinnamomum cassia | "Ginger; others say דארציני which is cinnamon" | דארציני; Cinnamomum cassia |
| Kila'im 1:2 | חרדל | אלכ'רדל הא"י; White mustard (Sinapis alba) (lit. "the Mustard of the Land of Israel") | אלכ'רדל; White mustard (Sinapis alba); Black mustard (Brassica nigra) | חרדל (ḥardal) | --- |
| Pesahim 2:6 | חרחבונה | אלחנדקוק; Sweet clover (Melilotus spp.; Trifolium spp.; Trigonella spp.) others say אלקרצעונה (Eryngium creticum) | אלקרצעינא (Eryngium creticum) | חרחבינין (ḥarḥabīnīn) | --- |
| Kila'im 2:8 | חריע | עצפר; Safflower (Carthamus tinctorius) כ'רוע; Castor bean (Ricinus communis) | אלעצפר; Safflower (Carthamus tinctorius) | מוריקא; Safflower (Carthamus spp.) | מוריקא (which in Arabic is called קורטים); Safflower (Carthamus spp.) |
| Kila'im 1:1 | טופח | אלגֻלבאן; Vetchling pea (Lathyrus spp.) | אלקרטמאן; Chickling vetch | --- | גולבאן “a kind of legume; in Arabic jūlebān” (Lathyrus spp.) |
| Shevi'it 9:1 | ירבוזין | אלגרבוז; Pigweed (Amaranthus blitum var. silvestre) | אלירבוז; Pigweed (Amaranthus blitum var. silvestre) | אספריג"י; Asparagus (Asparagus officinalis) | --- |
| Menahot 10:7 | כוסמין | אלעלס; Wild emmer (Triticum dicoccum) אלכרסנה; Vetch (Vicia ervilia) | אלקמח אלברי; Wild wheat | --- | --- |
| Shevi'it 7:6 | כופר | אלכאפור (al-kāffūr); Storax (Styrax officinalis) | אלחנא; Henna (Lawsonia inermis; L. alba) | גרופל"י; Clove (Caryophyllus aromaticus) | --- |
| Uktzin 1:6 | כליסין | אלתאלוק / אלכ'נס; Sycamore figs (Ficus sycamorus) | "a type of thin figs" (variant spelling: בלוסין) | כלס (kallis) | קומתורי; Wild Syrian pears (Pyrus syriaca) |
| Kila'im 1:3 | כרוב | אלכלם; Kohlrabi (Brassica var. caulorapa) | כרנב; Kale (Brassica oleracea var. acephala) | כרוב (karūb) | --- |
| Niddah 2:6 | כרכום | אלזעפראן; Saffron (Crocus spp.) | אלזעפראן; Saffron (Crocus sativus) | כורכמא / מוריקא; Saffron (Crocus sativus) | זעפראן; Saffron (Crocus spp.) |
| Sheviit 5:2 | לוף | אלקלקאס; Taro (Colocasia esculenta); Arum (Arum palaestinum) | “a kind of onion” | קאולוקאס"ו; Taro (Colocasia esculenta) (Arabic: קאלקס) | “similar to colocasia, and of its kind; bearing broad leaves” |
| Sheviit 7:6 | לטום | שאה בלוט; Chestnut (Castanea sativa) אלבלוט; Acorn | שאה בלוט; Chestnut (Castanea sativa) | גלנדא (Arabic: בלוט); Acorn | --- |
| Kila'im 1:3 | לעונין | שרשי הסלק; Beet roots (Beta vulgaris var. cicla) “A kind of chard” | אלקטף; Orache Atriplex hortensis; Sorrel (Rumex acetosa) | אטריצפ"י; Orache (Atriplex hortensis) (?) | --- |
| Kila'im 1:5 | לפסן | כתאה; Garden Rocket (Eruca sativa) | אללפסאן; Charlock mustard (Sinapis arvensis) | מרוי"ו; Horehound (Marrubium vulgare) | --- |
| Kila'im 1:2 | מלפפון | אלכ'רבז; Muskmelon (Cucumis melo) “one of the kinds of watermelon whose smell is sweet” | אלכ'יאר; Cucumber (Cucumis sativus) | מלפפון (melopeppon) | --- |
| Kila'im 1:3 | נפוס | אלגזר; Carrot (Daucus carota subsp. sativus) | פג'ל שאמי “Syrian radish” Rape (Brassica napus) | רדיק"י; Radish (Raphanus raphanistrum subsp. sativus) פשטינק"י; Parsnip (Pastinaca) | "hemā in the language employed by the rabbis; these are elongated" |
| Shevi'it 7:1 | נץ החלב | נואר אלמחלב; Blossom of the St. Lucie cherry (Prunus mahaleb) | אלמקדונס; Parsley (Petroselinum crispum var. tuberosum) | "white flowers; a weed from which exudes latex when cut" | חרשף; Thistle (Silybum marianum); artichoke (Cynara scolymus) |
| Avodah Zarah 1:5 | נקליבס | גוארשין millet (Panicum miliaceum) | "one of the [cereal] grasses" | נקלווס; Qariṭa in Arabic; Plantago ovata seeds | --- |
| Uktzin 2:2 | סיאה | אלסאיה (al-sā'ya) | אלפוד'נג (a generic word for aromatic plants of the family Lamiaceae) | צתרי, which is פוליו = pennyroyal; but others say סוסימברו (susimbro) | --- |
| Shevi'it 9:5 | סנריות | הנשים החגורות בסינר (“women who are girdled in a sinar”) | “an unidentified vegetable known to that place” | קרדי דומשתקי (Italian: cardi domestici) “domestic thistles” | --- |
| Kila'im 1:1 | ספיר | אלמאש; Mung bean (Vigna radiata) אלאקטן (Mung bean) | אלמאש; Mung bean (Phaseolus mungo); Hairy cowpea (Vigna luteola) | פישונה (ציצרקלא = Cicer spp.) “a black variety” | --- |
| Uktzin 3:4 | עדל | --- | אלשיטרג; Pepperwort (Lepidium latifolium) | “that which is similar to radish, but there are those who say Satureja (potherb)” | סיטרג דרקונת “a potherb, similar to radish; Dragon (?) pepperwort” (Explained by some to mean Lepidium latifolium, and by others to mean Inula helenium) |
| Demai 1:1 | עוזרר | אלזערור; Hawthorn (Crataegus aronia) אלתפאח / אלענזרוד | אלזערור; Hawthorn (Crataegus aronia) | אלזערור (Crataegus aronia) סורבא; Sorb-apples | זערור; Hawthorn (Crataegus aronia) |
| Uktzin 3:2 | עכביות | --- | “a plant whose leaves consist of many thorns... eaten either raw or cooked ...called by the Spaniards 'thistle'...” Wild artichoke (Cynara scolymus); Akkoub (Gundelia tournefortii) | “qōṣ (= thorn) this is the ʻakkabit” (Gundelia tournefortii) | --- |
| Tamid 2:3 | עץ שמן | אלצנובר; Aleppo pine (Pinus halepensis) | unidentified | “a genus of אלצנובר (Aleppo pine) which are the Pine nut [bearing trees] called Pino” | --- |
| Eruvin 2:6 (2:8) | עקרבנין | “a bitter plant called ʿaqrabitha” | אלעקרבאן; Hart's tongue fern (Asplenium scolopendrium) | “herbs with which one fulfills his obligation at Passover, and which sprout around the date-palm tree, and [which] Rabbi Hai Gaon explained as meaning `a very thick plant, having that which resembles needle points`” | (see explanation in Sefer Arukh) |
| Kila'im 1:1 | פול | דגרה; Cowpea (Vigna sinensis) | אלפול; Fava bean (Vicia faba) | פבא; Fava bean (Vicia faba) | --- |
| Shevi'it 9:1 | פיגם | אלשד'אב; Rue (Ruta chalepensis) | אלסד'אב; Rue (Ruta chalepensis) | רוט"א; Rue (Ruta chalepensis) | סדאב; Rue (Ruta chalepensis) |
| Kila'im 1:3 | פלוסלוס | כשד; Lablab bean (Lablab purpureus) | אלתרמס אלברי; Wild lupine | סלבטק"י; Wild lupine | --- |
| Shevi'it 2:7 | פרגין | ד'רה; Sorghum (Sorghum vulgare) אלכ'שכ'אס; Poppy seeds (P. somniferum) | אלכ'שכ'אש; Poppy seeds (Papaver somniferum) | פפאוור"ו; Poppy seeds (Papaver somniferum) | --- |
| Kila'im 1:4 | פרישין | אלספרג'ל; Quince (Cydonia oblonga) | אלספרג'ל; Quince (Cydonia oblonga) | צפרגל; Quince (Cydonia oblonga) | ספרגל; Quince (Cydonia oblonga) |
| Shabbat 2:1 | פתילת העידן | “that which resembles wool between the wood and bark of the willow, but others say it is the Sodom apple (Calotropis procera)” אלעשר (i.e. bast wick) | “a woollen [fibre] that appears in one of the herbal species” | עמרניתא דערבה (Wool-like bast of the willow tree) | --- |
| Shabbat 2:1 | פתילת המדבר | --- | “herbal leaves that can be twined and lit” | --- | --- |
| Shevi'it 7:1 | קוצה | חור; White poplar (Populus alba) | “one of the kinds of dyestuff, some of the commentators having explained it as meaning safflower (Carthamus tinctorius)” | רוייא (Robbia = Dyer's madder) | --- |
| Uktzin 2:2 | קורנית | סאחיה (sāḥiyya) | “al-ḥāšā, very popular among the physicians, and which is a herb among the Lamiaceae” | אוריגנו, but others say סדוריא (“Oregano, others say Satureja [=savory]”) | --- |
| Shevi'it 7:6 | קטף | אלאסטיראק; Oleoresin of the Styrax officinalis בלסאן; Balsam | עוד אלבלסאן; Balsam (Commiphora gileadensis) | בלסמ"ו; Balsam (Commiphora gileadensis) | --- |
| Kila'im 5:8 | קינרס | אבאדנגאן; Aubergine / egg plant (Solanum melongena) | אלקנאריה; Artichoke (Cynara cardunculus var. scolymus) | --- | --- |
| Kila'im 5:8 | קנבס | אלקנב; Hemp (Cannabis indica) | אלקנאב; Hemp (Cannabis indica) | קנב"ו; Hemp (Cannabis indica) | --- |
| Kila'im 5:8 | קסוס | אללבלאר; Bindweed (Convolvulus spp.) אלעלפק (al-ʿalfiq) | אללבלאר; Bindweed (Convolvulus spp.) | אידר"א; Ivy (Hedera) | חולבאנא (a thorn) |
| Uktzin 1:2 | קפלוטות | אלכראת' אלשאמי; Syrian leeks (Allium ampeloprasum var. kurrat) | אלכראת' אלשאמי; Syrian leeks (Allium ampeloprasum var. kurrat) | Greek: קיפאל"י (kefáli); Head [of leeks] | --- |
| Kila'im 1:4 | קרוסטמלין | אלכמת'רי; Pear (Pyrus spp.) אלברקוק; Apricot (Prunus armeniaca) | אלכמת'רי “Pears (al-kummathra) which are commonly known among us under the name al-’inğās” Pear (Pyrus syriaca) | גרוסומיל"י pear; small apple | "little apples resembling galls" |
| Terumot 3:1 | sing. קשות pl. קישואין | אלקת'א; Egyptian cucumber (Cucumis melo var. chate) | אלקת'א; Egyptian cucumber (Cucumis melo var. chate) פקוס; Hairy cucumber (Faqqūs); Cucumis sativus, var. chate | Arabic: אלכיאר (al-khiyyar); Cucumber (Cucumis sativus) | אלכ'יאר; Cucumber (Cucumis sativus) |
| Demai 1:1 | רימין | אלנבק אלדום; Christ's thorn jujube (Ziziphus spina-christi) | סדר; אלנבק; Jujube (Ziziphus spina-christi) | פולצרק"י | --- |
| Shevi'it 7:2 | רכפה | הֻרד; Turmeric (Curcuma longa) אלבחם | אלבקם; Weld (Reseda luteola) | שגר מרים; Root of the tree Shejar Maryam | --- |
| Menahot 10:7 | שבולת שועל | סנבלת אלת'עלב; Fox's spike | סנבל אלת'עלב (שעיר ברי); Wild barley (Hordeum spontaneum) | סיקל"א; Rye (Secale cereale); Others say בינ"א | --- |
| Kila'im 5:8 | שושנת המלך | אכליל אלמלך; Sweet clover (Melilotus) | שקאיק אלנעמאן; Anemone (Anemone coronaria) | שושנת המלך (King's lily) | --- |
| Menahot 10:7 | שיפון | אלסאפה; Oats (Avena sterilis); Ovate goatgrass (Aegilops geniculata) | “a kind of wild barley” אלדוסר; Avena or Aegilops | אספילת"א; Spelt (Triticum spelta) | --- |
| Kila'im 1:1 | שעועית | אלעתר; Field pea (Pisum sativum) | אללוביה; Cowpea (Vigna sinensis) | פסילתא | --- |
| Kelim 14:5 | שעם (שגמין) | כיזראן; Bamboo (Bambusa vulgaris) | ח'יזראן; Bamboo (Bambusa vulgaris) | “wood bark, which is: שגמין” | similar to: כיזוראן; Bamboo (Bambusa vulgaris) |
| Shevi'it 4:5 | שקמה; See supra בנות שקמה | --- | --- | --- | --- |
| Kila'im 2:5 | תלתן | אלחלבה; Fenugreek (Trigonella foenum-graecum) | אלחלבה; Fenugreek (Trigonella foenum-graecum) | Arabic: חולב"א (ḥulba); Fenugreek | חולבה; Fenugreek (Trigonella foenum-graecum) |
| Pesahim 2:6 | תמכה | אלשילם (al-shaylam) | סריס; Endives (Cichorium endivia) or Wild chicory (Cichorium divaricatum) | קרד"ו (cardo = Thistle) others say מרו"ו | --- |
| Kila'im 1:3 | תרדין | מיני סלק; Varieties of chard; white beet (Beta vulgaris subsp. vulgaris; Beta vulgaris, var. cicla) | אלסלק (Beta vulgaris) | בלי"ט; Goosefoot (Blitum virgatum) “any of the boiled leafy vegetables” | אלסלק; Chard (Beta vulgaris subsp. vulgaris) |
| Kila'im 1:3 | תרופתור | אלקרנביט; Cauliflower (Brassica oleracea botrytis) | “a wild cabbage (kale) whose stalks are thin” | Arabic: קרנביט (qarnabiṭ); Cauliflower | --- |

Occasionally, Nathan ben Abraham relates to the practical usages of plants in the Land of Israel and in the region of Syria, writing, for example, that either Judas tree florets (Cercis siliquastrum) (Judeo-Arabic: דאד'י) [variant: St. John's wort (Hypericum spp.)] or violets (Viola odorata) (Judeo-Arabic: אלבנפסג) were placed in flagons of wine to impart their flavor, while rose florets (Rosa) were used to impart flavor to olive oil and to sesame seeds.

=== Modern Hebrew usages ===
In Modern Hebrew nomenclature, some of the plant identifications have changed since medieval times. For example, the Modern Hebrew word for cucumber is melafefon (a word formerly used for "melon"). The word kishū’īm (formerly "cucumbers") is now applied to zucchini squash (Cucurbita pepo var. cylindrica), a plant native to the New World. In modern colloquial Hebrew, the word ḥazeret (formerly "lettuce") is now used to denote horseradish (Armoracia rusticana). Karkūm, formerly used in Hebrew to denote only saffron, is now used also for turmeric. Lūf (formerly Arum palaestinum) is now used in modern colloquial Hebrew to denote the broadleaf wild leek (Allium ampeloprasum). Modern botanists in Israel now call Clover (Trifolium) by the name tiltan, which word formerly meant "fenugreek" (Trigonella foenum-graecum). Modern Hebrew now calls cork (Quercus suber) by the name "sha'am," although in Rabbi Nathan's day it had the meaning of "bamboo." Afūnna (der. of afūnnin) is now used in Modern Hebrew as a generic word for all kinds of garden peas, when formerly it was used strictly for chickpeas (Cicer arietinum). Cauliflower is now called krūvīt in Modern Hebrew, but which formerly was known as therūḇtor. In many cases, Arabic names are used to identify plants. Most Hebrew speakers will call the frothy relish made from fenugreek by its Arabic name, ḥilbah. So, too, the biblical hyssop, eizoḇ, is now popularly called by its Arabic name, zaatar. The Arabic word sabōn which is now used for soap (borit) is related to the Aramaic word ṣap̄ona = ܨܦܘܢܐ (soap). In other cases, Eliezer Ben-Yehuda invented new words, such as ḥatzilīm (egg-plants; aubergines), to take the place of Hebrew words long forgotten, but what Nathan ben Abraham understood as being called qīnras.

=== Difficult words ===
Some referents of Hebrew words have become so entrenched in rabbinic disputes that it is now difficult to ascertain what their original meanings may have been, such as the adjective qamūr (Hebrew: קמור / קמורה), in Mishnah Ohalot 3:7, op. cit. 5:1 and Eruvin 8:10. Rabbi Nathan (Ohalot) explains the word as meaning "plastered," (such as with gypsum and which repels water), but Maimonides explained the same word as meaning "dome-shaped." For one, the mouth of an earthenware oven which projected outside the house would be protected from the elements by virtue of its dome-like structure, while, for the other, because of its plastering. R. Hai Gaon explained it differently, saying that qamūr was an opening [of the oven or drain pipe] built at its base near to the ground so that the influx of air will cause the fire to burn well, in the case of the oven, or allow for a drainage pipe to air out.

=== Modern discovery ===
The manuscript was retrieved in ca. 1927 by Rabbi Yihya al-Qafih, from the place used by the Jewish community in Sana'a to bury old and worn-out sacred literature (genizah), within the Jewish cemetery itself on the outskirts of the city. Three copies were made of the original manuscript, before it was sold to a certain Shelomo Halevi Busani (later of Tel-Aviv), who, in turn, sold the manuscript to the Schechter Library in New York. Today, the original manuscript is housed at the Jewish Theological Seminary of America, under JTS Rab. 1492. One of the three remaining copies, copied in 1930 by Qafih's grandson, was acquired by the Hebrew University library, from which a comprehensive study was made of the text by Professor Simcha Assaf who published his findings in the periodical Kiryat Sefer, in 1933.

The British Museum possesses a partial copy of Nathan ben Abraham's Judeo-Arabic commentary of the Mishnah (with only the Mishnaic Orders of Zera'im, Mo'ed and Neziqin).

Among the manuscripts and incunabula collected by David Solomon Sassoon is a two-page Judeo-Arabic copy of the Introduction taken from Rabbi Nathan's commentary, believed to have been singled-out because of its more profound nature. Rabbi Yosef Qafih has provided a Hebrew translation of the Introduction in the Mishnah published by El ha-Meqorot.

=== Publications ===
The earliest modern-day printing of Rabbi Nathan's work came in 1955, when the El Meqorot publishers of Jerusalem printed the Hebrew translation of Rabbi Nathan's commentary, yet only as a supplement to other commentaries. In 1958, the same publishers published a single edition, edited by Mordechai Yehuda Leib Sachs. A third edition was published by them in 1965. The Harry Fischel Institute in Jerusalem published the Mishnaic order of Zera'im. In 1973, Me'orot publishers of Jerusalem published an edition of the commentary, although it too was not an exclusive edition, but incorporated other commentaries.

== See also ==
- Palestinian Gaonate
- Talmudic Academies in Syria Palaestina
- List of native plants of Flora Palaestina (A-B)
- List of native plants of Flora Palaestina (C-D)
- List of native plants of Flora Palaestina (E-O)
- List of native plants of Flora Palaestina (P-Z)
- Wild edible plants of Israel / Palestine

== Bibliography ==
- Al-Fasi, D. (1936–1945). Solomon L. Skoss (ed.). The Hebrew-Arabic Dictionary of the Bible, Known as 'Kitāb Jāmiʿ al-Alfāẓ' (Agron) (in Hebrew). Vol. 1–2. New Haven: Yale University Press.
- Alfasi, I. (1960). Yosef Qafih (ed.). R. Yitzhak Alfasi's Commentary on Tractate Hullin (Chapter Kol ha-Basar) (in Hebrew). ha-Agudah le-Hatzalat Ginzei Teiman. OCLC 745065428.
- Amar, Z. (2000). Agricultural Produce in the Land of Israel in the Middle Ages (in Hebrew). Jerusalem: Ben-Zvi Institute. ISBN 965-217-174-3.
- Amar, Z.; Serri, Yaron (2000–2001). "Compilation from Jonah Ibn Ǧanāḥ's Dictionary of Medical Terms / ליקוטים ממילון שמות הרפואות של ר' יונה אבן ג'נאח". Lĕšonénu: A Journal for the Study of the Hebrew Language and Cognate Subjects (in Hebrew). 63 (3/4). Academy of the Hebrew Language: 279–291. JSTOR 24330601.
- Amar, Z. (2011a). Five Types of Grain: Historical, Halachic, and Conceptual Aspects (Ḥameshet Mine Dagan) (in Hebrew). Machon Har Beracha. ISBN 978-965-908-187-5.--(ISBN 978-965-90818-7-5)
- Amar, Z.; Kapah, E. (2011b), "The Yemenite Commentary of Rabbi Nathan, President of the Academy, on the Identification of Flora in the Mishnah", in Ayelet Oettinger; Danny Bar-Maoz (eds.), Mittuv Yosef – Yosef Tobi Jubilee Volume, The Jews of Yemen: History and Culture, vol. 2, Haifa: University of Haifa (Center for the Study of Jewish Culture in Spain and in Islamic Countries), OCLC 713933314
- Amar, Z. (2012). Flora of the Bible - A New Investigation Aimed at Identifying All of the Plants of the Bible in Light of Jewish Sources and Scientific Research (in Hebrew). Jerusalem: Rubin Mass Ltd. OCLC 783455868.
- Amar, Z. (2015). Flora and Fauna in Maimonides' Teachings (in Hebrew). Kfar Darom. OCLC 783455868.
- Assaf, Simcha [in Hebrew] (1933–1934). "Miginzei beit ha-sefarim - A Commentary on the Six Orders of the Mishnah belonging to R. Nathan, the President of the Academy". Kiryat Sefer (Year 10) (in Hebrew). Jerusalem.
- Assaf, Simcha [in Hebrew] (1955). Tequfat ha-Geonim we-Sifrutah (The Geonic Era and its Literature) (in Hebrew).(= Kiryat Sefer, X [1934])
- Ben Melchizedek, I. (1975). Nisan Zaks (ed.). Mishnah Zera'im, with the Commentary of Ribmaṣ (in Hebrew). Jerusalem: Makhon ha-Talmud ha-Yisraeli ha-Shalem. OCLC 745167494.
- Bos, Gerrit [in German]; Käs, Fabian (2016). "Arabic Pharmacognostic Literature and Its Jewish Antecedents: Marwān ibn Ǧanāḥ (Rabbi Jonah), Kitāb al-Talḫīṣ". Aleph. 16 (1). Indiana University Press: 145–229. doi:10.2979/aleph.16.1.145. JSTOR 10.2979/aleph.16.1.145. S2CID 171046217.
- Dalman, Gustaf (2013). Work and Customs in Palestine. Vol. I/2. Translated by Nadia Abdulhadi Sukhtian. Ramallah: Dar Al Nasher. ISBN 9789950385-01-6. OCLC 1040774903.
- Dalman, Gustaf (2020). Nadia Abdulhadi-Sukhtian (ed.). Work and Customs in Palestine, volume II. Vol. 2 (Agriculture). Translated by Robert Schick. Ramallah: Dar Al Nasher. ISBN 978-9950-385-84-9.
- Danzig, Nahman (1998). Catalogue of Fragments of Halakhah and Midrash from the Cairo Genizah in the E.N. Adler Collection of the Library of JTS: the Jewish Theological Seminary of America, New York 1998, p. 47
- Epstein, J.N. (1945). "The Supplement to the Gaonic Commentary to Taharot". Tarbiẕ (in Hebrew). 16 (2/3). JSTOR 23585385.
- Feliks, Jehuda [in Hebrew]; Margalioth, Mordecai (1973). Hilkhot Erets Yisra'el min ha-Genizah (in Hebrew). Jerusalem: Mossad Harav Kook. OCLC 19497945.
- Fox, Menahem Zvi (1994). Ha-mishnah be-teman, kettuv-yad miperush rav nathan av ha-yeshivah, Assufot (Year Book), [8], pp. 161–167
- Friedman, Mordechai A. (1990a). "Responsa of R. Abraham Maimonides from the Cairo Geniza a Preliminary Review". Proceedings of the American Academy for Jewish Research. 56. American Academy for Jewish Research, Ann Arbor, MI: 29–49. doi:10.2307/3622642. JSTOR 3622642.
- Friedman, Mordechai A. (1990b). "Masa u-matan bayn hakham miteman le-rabbi avraham ben ha-rambam 'al kesef ha-ketubbah ve-'al samkhut ha-masoret", Te'udah (14), pp. 139–192
- Geoponika - Agricultural Pursuits. Vol. 2. Translated by Owen, T. London: University of Oxford. 1806.
- Gil, Moshe (1983). Eretz yisrael bit'kufah ha-muslamit ha-rishonah (634–1099) [Palestine during the First Muslim Period (634–1099)], Tel-Aviv, pp. 582–583
- Hai Gaon (1921–1924), "Hai Gaon's Commentary on Seder Taharot", in Epstein, J.N. (ed.), The Geonic Commentary on Seder Taharot - Attributed to Rabbi Hai Gaon (in Hebrew), vol. 1–2, Berlin: Itzkowski, OCLC 13977130 (Available online, at HebrewBooks.org: The Geonic Commentary on Seder Taharot - vol. 1; The Geonic Commentary on Seder Taharot - vol. 2)
- Ibn al-'Awwam (Abu Zacaria), Iahia (1802). Libro de Agricultura (Kitāb al-Filāḥa) (in Spanish and Arabic). Vol. 1. Translated by Josef Antonio Banqueri. Madrid: Imprenta Real. p. 336 (ch. 7 - article 40). OCLC 476348685.
- Ibn al-'Awwam, Yaḥyá (1864). Le livre de l'agriculture d'Ibn-al-Awam (kitab-al-felahah) (in French). Translated by J.-J. Clement-Mullet. Paris: A. Franck. OCLC 780050566.
- Ibn al-Baitar (1989). Ibrahim Ben Mrad (ed.). Tafsīr Kitāb Diāsqūrīdūs (in Arabic). Beirut: Dar Algharb Al'Islami. OCLC 957197903.
- Ibn Ǧanāḥ, Yonah (1896). A. Berliner (ed.). Book of the Roots (Sepher Haschoraschim) (in Hebrew). Berlin.
- Ishtori Haparchi (1999). Avraham Yosef Havatzelet (ed.). Sefer Kaftor Ve'ferah (in Hebrew). Vol. 3 (chapter 56). Jerusalem: Bet ha-midrash la-halakhah ba-hityashvut. OCLC 32307172.
- Jastrow, M., ed. (2006), Dictionary of the Targumim, the Talmud Babli and Yerushalmi, and the Midrashic Literature, Peabody, Mass.: Hendrickson Publishers, OCLC 614562238
- Kapah, El'ad (2007). The Identification of the Mishna Plants According to Rabbi Nathan's Commentary of the Mishna (in Hebrew). Ramat Gan: Bar-Ilan University.
- Maimonides (1963–1967). Mishnah, with Maimonides' Commentary (in Hebrew). Vol. 1–3. Translated by Yosef Qafih. Jerusalem: Mossad Harav Kook. OCLC 741081810.
- Nathan ben Abraham (1955), "Perush Shishah Sidrei Mishnah - A Commentary on the Six Orders of the Mishnah", in Sachs, Mordecai Yehudah Leib (ed.), The Six Orders of the Mishnah: with the Commentaries of the Rishonim (in Hebrew), Jerusalem: El ha-Meqorot, OCLC 233403923
- Payne Smith, J. (1903). A compendious Syriac Dictionary: founded upon the Thesaurus Syriacus of R. Payne Smith (in Syriac and English). Oxford: Clarendon Press. OCLC 251355373.
- Pliny the Elder (1951). Natural History. Vol. VI: Books 20-23. Translated by W. H. S. Jones. Cambridge, MA: Harvard University Press: Loeb Classical Library.
- Qafih, Y. (2018), "Yemenite Jewry's Connections with Major Jewish Centers", in Yedid, Rachel; Bar-Maoz, Danny (eds.), Ascending the Palm Tree – An Anthology of the Yemenite Jewish Heritage, Rehovot: E'ele BeTamar, OCLC 1041776317
- Sassoon, D.S., ed. (1932), Ohel Dawid - Descriptive Catalogue of the Hebrew and Samaritan Manuscripts in the Sassoon Library, vol. 2, London, OCLC 71513156
- Schlossberg, Eliezer (1993). "Arabic Words in the Commentary of R. Yiẕḥaq ben R. Malkiẕedeq of Simponto to Mišna Zěraʿim". Lĕšonénu: A Journal for the Study of the Hebrew Language and Cognate Subjects (in Hebrew). The Academy of the Hebrew Language: 147–155. JSTOR 24346981.
- Schlossberg, Eliezer (2005). "On Maimonides' Commentary on the Tractate Shabbat". Pe'amim: Studies in Oriental Jewry (in Hebrew). 101/102.
- Smith, W., ed. (1872), "sisymbrium (σισύμριον)", Dictionary of Greek and Roman Antiquities (3rd ed.), New York
- Stillman, N.A., ed. (2010), Encyclopedia of Jews in the Islamic World, vol. 3, Leiden: Brill, OCLC 650852958
- Witztum, Allan (1992). "Hebrew, Aramaic and Arabic Names for Plants in the Mint Family". Lĕšonénu: A Journal for the Study of the Hebrew Language and Cognate Subjects (in Hebrew): 147–151. JSTOR 24345785.
