= David Sassoon =

David Sassoon may refer to:

- David Sassoon (designer) (1932–2025), British fashion designer
- David Sassoon (treasurer) (1792–1864), Iraqi-Jewish treasurer
- David Solomon Sassoon (1880–1942), Iraqi bibliophile

== See also ==
- Sassoon family
- Albert Abdullah David Sassoon (1818–1896), English businessman
- David Sasson, Israeli diplomat
- David of Sassoun, a fictional character in the Armenian war poem Daredevils of Sassoun
- Frederick David Sassoon (1853–1917), English merchant
- Reuben David Sassoon (1835–1905), English merchant
- Solomon David Sassoon (1915–1985), English educator
- Solomon David Sassoon (1841–1894), (1841–1894), English businessman
- Sassoon David Sassoon (1831–1867), English businessman
