= Rachel Sassoon =

Rachel Sassoon may refer to:

- Rachel Beer (1858–1927), British newspaper editor
- Rachel Sassoon Ezra (1877–1952), Indian philanthropist
