= Bahag =

Bahag may refer to:

- Bahag (garment), a type of loincloth worn in the Philippines
- Simeon Kayyara or B^{a}H^{a}G (acronym for Baal Halachot Gedolot), 9th-century Jewish author

== See also ==
- Bihag, a classical raga
