= Halachot Pesukot =

Geonic halakhic work

Halachot Pesukot (Hebrew: הלכות פסוקות, lit. 'Legal rulings') is a condensed rabbinic work attributed to Yehudai Gaon in the Geonic Era, containing chapters on common Jewish halachic themes. The work was compiled in the 8th century, two hundred years after the closing of the Babylonian Talmud. It was written in Jewish Babylonian Aramaic and follows the format of the Halachot Gedolot which antedates it by about 20 years.

== Authorship ==
While the work is generally attributed to Judah the Blind, gaon (head) of Sura Academy, some scholars attribute scholarship instead to the Exilarch Makhir of Narbonne (d. about 739). The gaon, who was blind, did not write with his own hands but rather dictated by scribes. Hai ben Sherira, gaon of Pumbedita Academy, noted that "anything that the sages did not hear from his mouth they do not attribute to him when it contains a difficulty, nor do we rely on it, because we say that the scribe was the one who made the mistake or that someone else wrote in his name".

In his 1998 book The Geonim of Babylonia and the Shaping of Medieval Jewish Culture, Robert Brody, a professor at Hebrew University of Jerusalem, concluded that the Halachot Pesukot was written outside of Mesopotamia.

== Editions ==
In 1886, A.L. Schlossberg published in Versailles an edition of Halachot Pesukot which he based on the Oxford Manuscript. In 1911, David Solomon Sassoon purchased a handwritten manuscript of the work while visiting Yemen, and which based on its style, appears to have been written in Babylon or Persia in the ninth or tenth century. A description of the manuscript is found in Sassoon's Ohel Dawid catalogue. The manuscript was first published by his son, Solomon David Sassoon, in 1951, and has been published several times since then by other editors.

Schlossberg's edition, which he prepared from the Oxford Manuscript, differs slightly from the Sassoon Manuscript version. Schlossberg's edition contains 3 additional halakhic discourses on Megillah, Hanukkah, and kosher wine, which do not appear in Sassoon's copy. Conversely, Sassoon's copy contains 2 additions not found in Schlossberg's edition: Berakhot and the defects of slaughtered animals in the Land of Israel.
