= Rachel Sassoon Ezra =

Indian philanthropist (1877–1952)

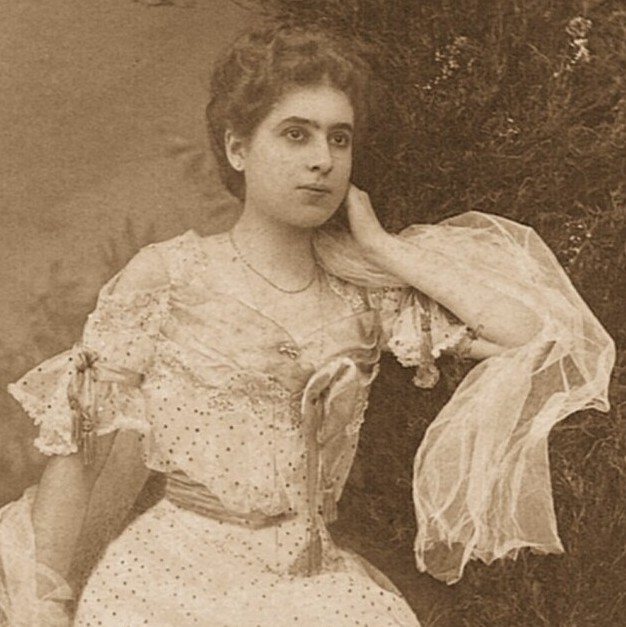
- photographer and date unknown
- Born: Rachel Sassoon; 18 May 1877; Bombay
- Died: 25 January 1952 (aged 74); Calcutta
- Occupations: Philanthropist, community leader
- Spouse: David Elias Ezra
- Parent(s): Solomon David Sassoon, Flora Sassoon
- Relatives: Sassoon family

Rachel Sassoon Ezra (18 May 1877 – 25 January 1952), known as Lady Ezra, was an Indian philanthropist and community leader, a member of the Sassoon family, and wife of banker David Elias Ezra.

== Early life ==
Rachel Sassoon was born in Bombay, the daughter of Sir Solomon David Sassoon and Flora Gubbay Sassoon. She was part of the Baghdadi Jewish community, a member of the noted Sassoon family; her father was a prominent businessman and philanthropist; her grandfather was David Sassoon and her great-grandfather was Albert Sassoon. Her younger brother was David Solomon Sassoon.

== Career ==
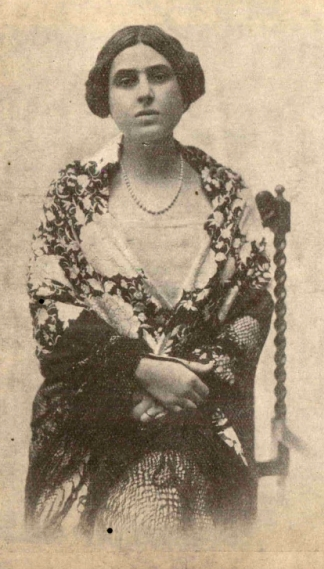
c. 1936

Rachel Sassoon lived in England as a young woman, and helped her widowed mother run her late father's business in India, from 1894 until 1902. As Lady Ezra, she was president of the Jewish Women's League of Calcutta. She was active with the Countess of Dufferin Fund, the Lady Minto Nursing Association, the All-Bengal Women's Union, the Bombay Women's Work Guild, and the National Council of Women in India. She was commissioner of Girl Guides for Calcutta. In 1925, she wrote a travel brochure, From Damascus to Baghdad: A Trip Across the Syrian Desert. In 1938, she wrote a greeting to the members of the Parliament of the World's Religions, when the group met in Calcutta.

During both World War I and World War II, she opened her home to host Jewish servicemen and women while they were based in Calcutta. The British government awarded her the gold Kaisar-i-Hind Medal in 1947. In 1951, she donated a Sephardic Sefer Torah to the Hobart Synagogue. "She was distinguished for her philanthropy and social service, and achieved communal and national recognition in these spheres," summed Percy Sassoon Gourgey in a 1953 memorial tribute.

== Personal life ==
Rachel Sassoon married banker and community leader Sir David Elias Ezra in 1912. "The marriage of Rachel and David Ezra represented the coming together of India's two most powerful Jewish families," commented historian Elizabeth E. Imber in a 2018 article. Her husband died in 1947, and she died in 1952, aged 74 years, in Calcutta. The Rachel and David Ezra Archive is part of the Sassoon Family Archive at the National Library of Israel.
