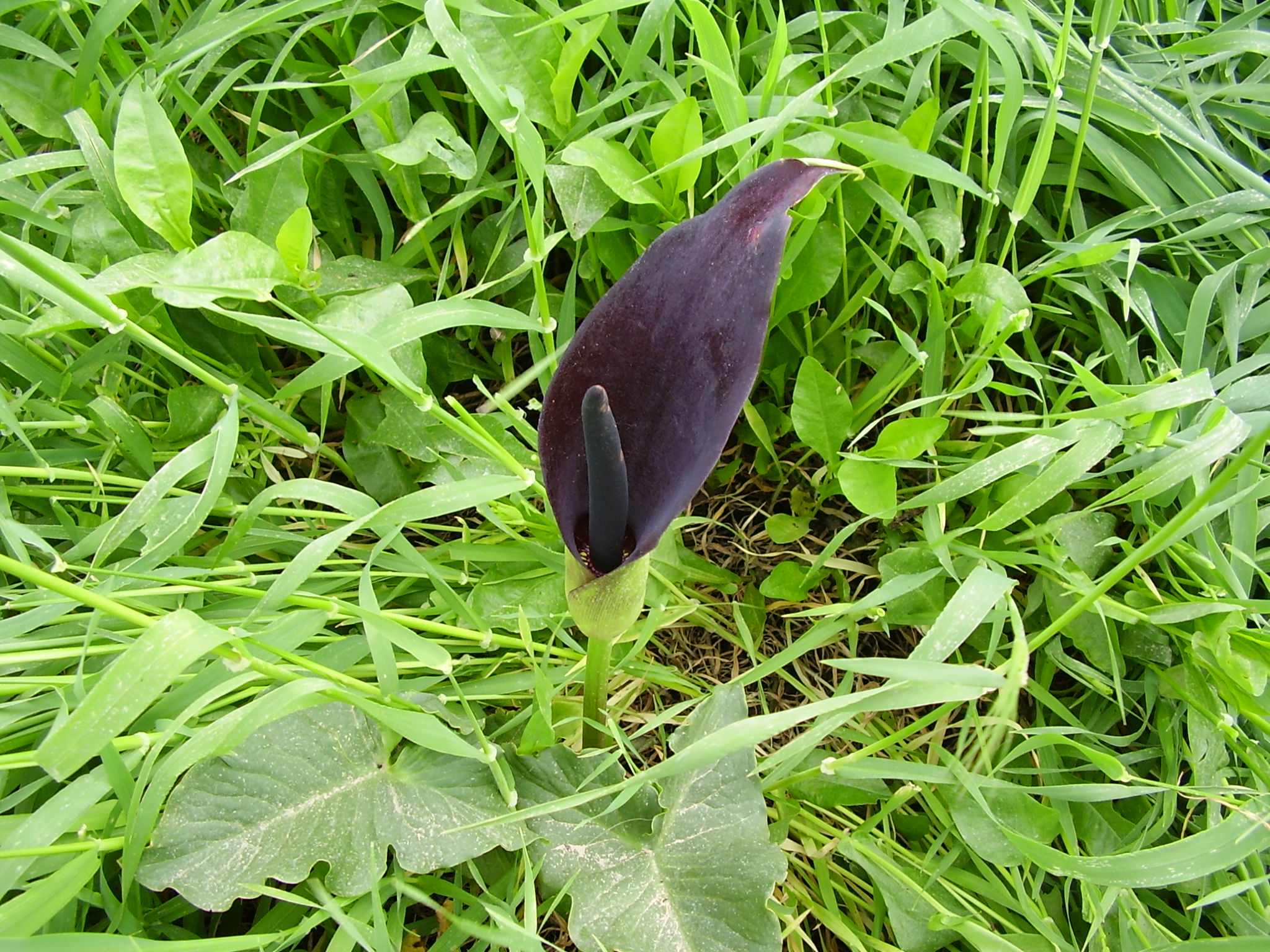

Scientific classification
- Kingdom: Plantae
- Clade: Tracheophytes
- Clade: Angiosperms
- Clade: Monocots
- Order: Alismatales
- Family: Araceae
- Genus: Arum
- Species: A. palaestinum

Binomial name
- Arum palaestinum Boiss. (1854)

Synonyms
- Arum magdalenae Sprenger; Arum sanctum Dammer; Richardia sancta (Dammer) Pynaert

= Arum palaestinum =

Species of flowering plant

Arum palaestinum is a species of flowering herbaceous perennial plant in the genus Arum and the family Araceae. It is also known as black calla, Solomon's lily, priest's hood, noo'ah loof and kardi.

Native to the Mediterranean Basin, it is employed in the Middle East for culinary and medicinal purposes.

== Description ==
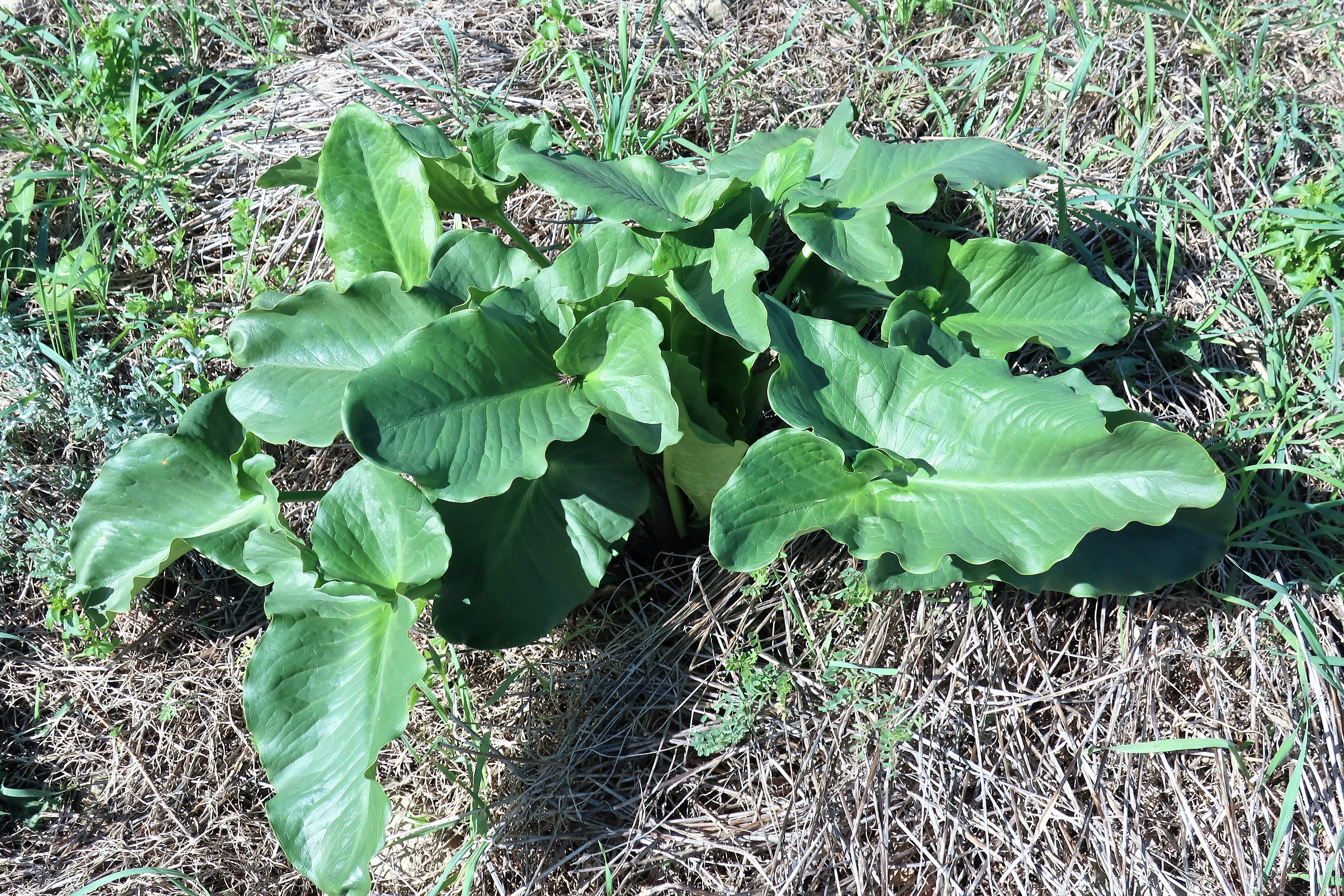
The broad leaves

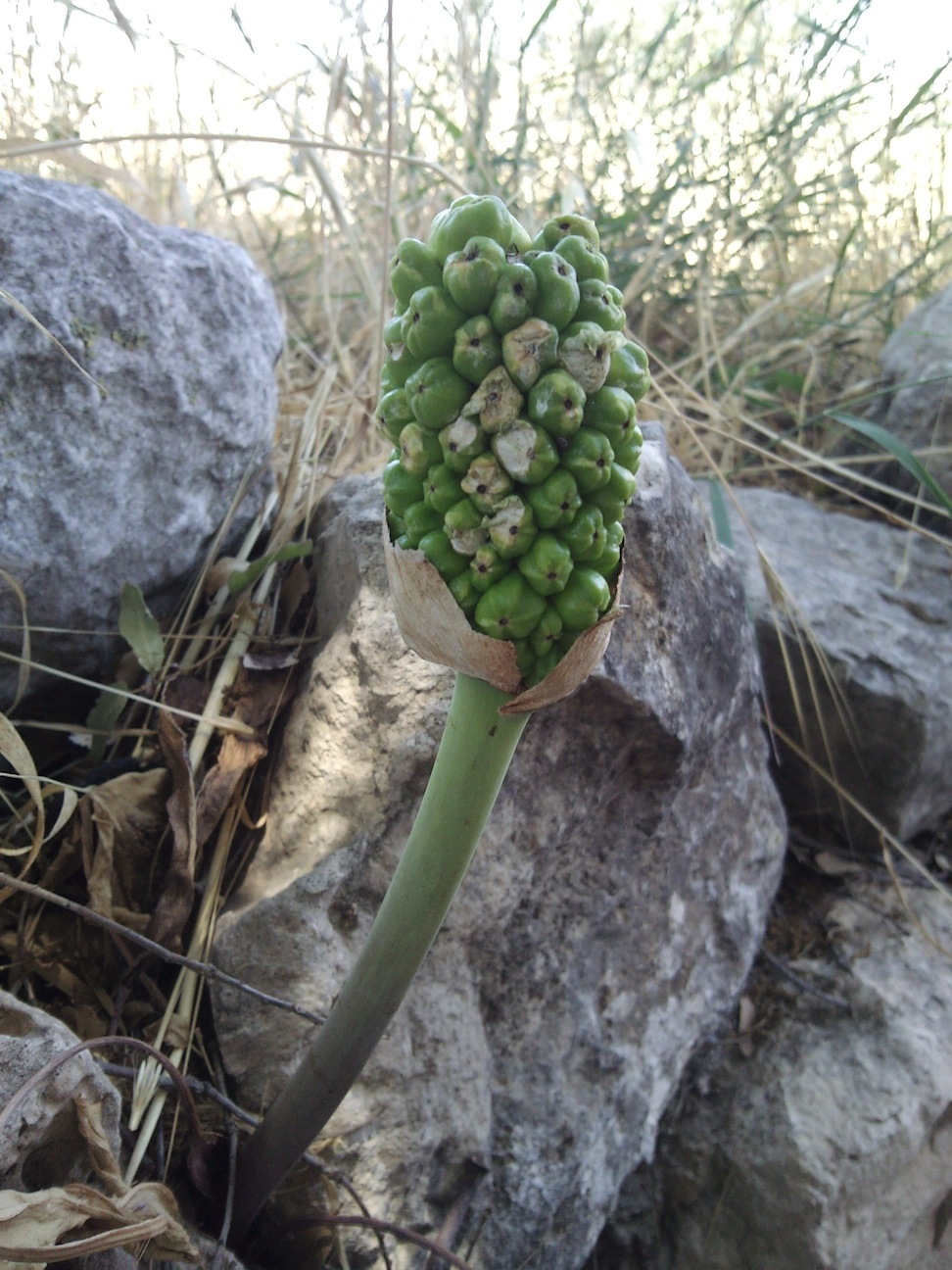
Unripe berries

A perennial plant, A. palaestinum grows up to 10–25 cm (4–10 in) high. The leaves are light green, narrow, and upright with a purplish-black color. The root is tuberous. It blooms between the months of March and April, by which time the plant is easily recognized by its dark purplish-black spadix enclosed by a reddish-brown spathe.

By relative inflorescence height, Arum species are divided into "cryptic" species, whose inflorescences are borne on a short peduncle amid or below the leaves, and "flag" species, whose inflorescences are above leaf level at the end of long peduncles. A. palaestinum is a cryptic species. Like other members of the genus Arum, this plant gives off a scent that attracts flies, which distribute the pollen; while most other family members smell like dung and carrion, this plant can smell like rotting fruit as well.

== Taxonomy ==
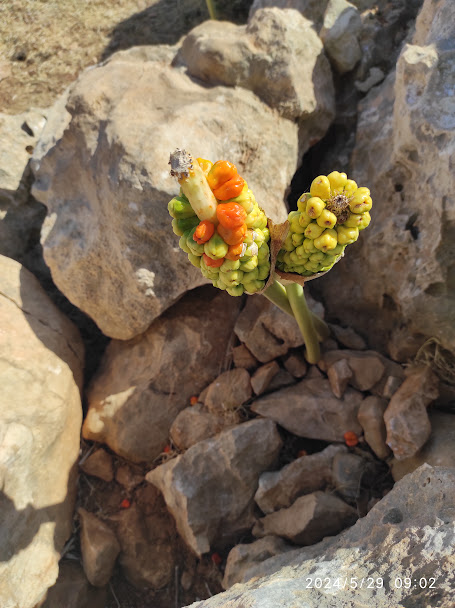
The ripening berries

The first botanical depiction of the species was drawn by Walter Hood Fitch and published in the 1865 volume of Curtis's Botanical Magazine.

The specific epithet is derived from Palestine, and it is native to the Levant and other parts of the Mediterranean Basin, and has been naturalized in North America, North Africa, Europe, Western Asia, and Australia.

== Distribution and habitat ==
Arum palaestinum is native to the Levant and other parts of the Mediterranean Basin. It has been naturalized in Europe, Western Asia, North Africa, North America, and Australia.

Early collections were made by Kotschy in 1855 (Jerusalem), Haussknecht in 1867 (Onsuar Gudrun), Barbey in 1880 (Nablus), Johannet in 1889 (Bethany), and Bornmüller in 1897 (Jaffa).

== Toxicity ==
The species is toxic at low doses, and this has traditionally been considered to be due to oxalate salts, but this is not certain. The leaves of the plant contain calcium oxalate and other toxins that can be removed by leaching.

The symptoms caused by exposure to the raw plant include mucous membrane irritation, and burning, and consuming larger doses causes nausea, diarrhea, and cramping. Because exposure to skin can cause irritation it is often handled lightly, or with gloves. Eating even a tiny amount raw will cause numbness in the tongue and mouth.

== Uses ==
=== Food ===
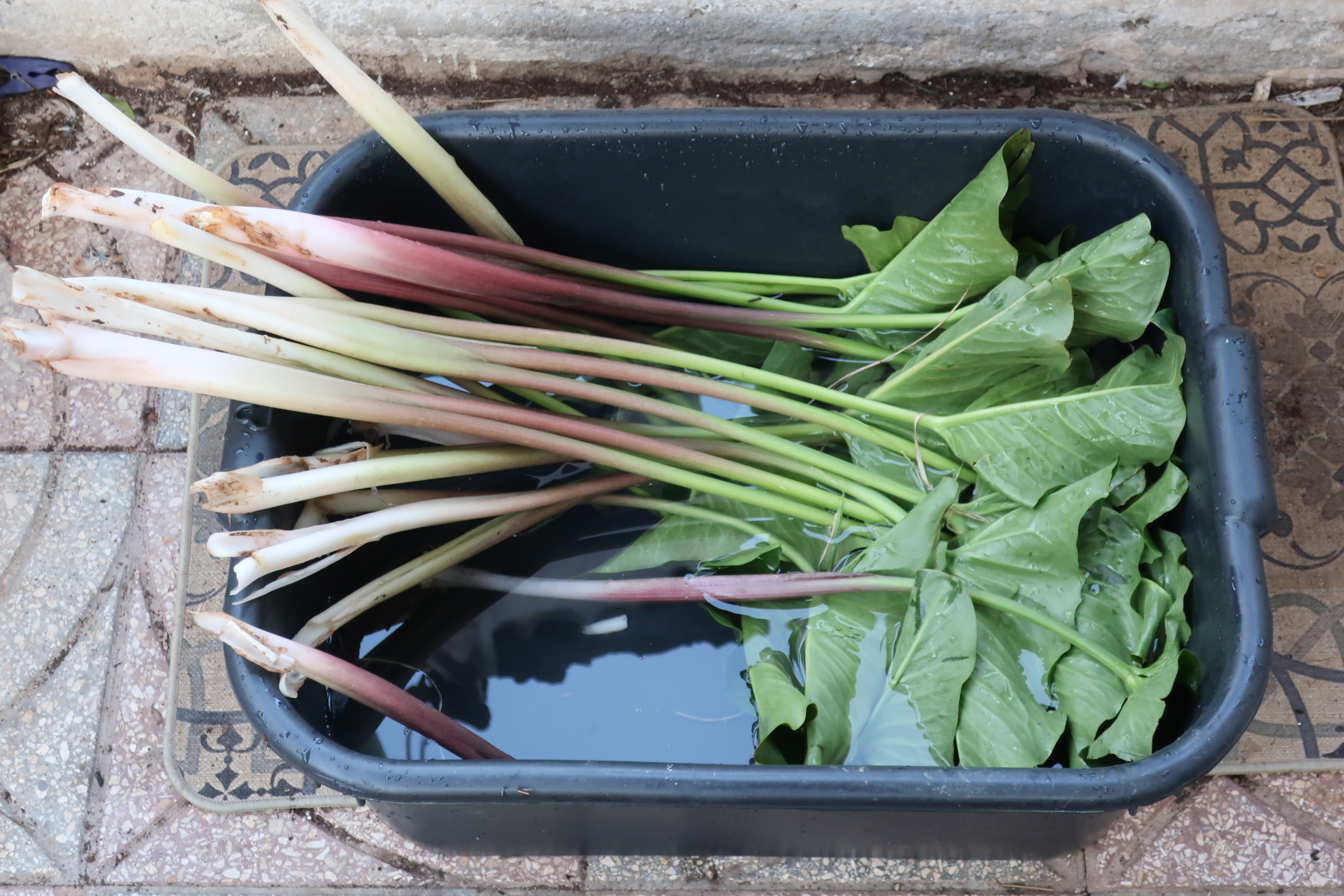
Freshly harvested leaves

The leaves and tubers are edible after being leached. The cooking process is thought to remove the toxicity.

In Middle Eastern cuisine, the leaves are cut up and thoroughly cooked with lemon or sorrel. It is also used in soups.

It is commonly consumed with flat bread or bulgur, and is reported to have a taste similar to Swiss chard.

=== Medicinal uses ===
In traditional medicine among indigenous peoples of the Levant, A. palaestinum extracts have been used for cancer, intestinal worms, infections in open wounds, urinary tract obstructions, and kidney stones, and are thought to strengthen bones. Jews in Iraq have used it traditionally for worms, skin sores, syphilis, rheumatism, tuberculosis, and diarrhea. It has also been used for cough and constipation.

Ethnobotanical data have shown that A. palaestinum was reported as one of the most commonly used plants among Palestinians in the West Bank, used by over half of all respondents.

In a recent revision of his book, Killing Cancer – Not People, author Robert G. Wright discusses one dietary supplement company's use of the species in one of its products.

== In culture ==
Engraved drawings of various species of Arum are seen in the Temple of Thutmose III in Karnak (Egypt), depicting the plants when they were brought from Canaan in the year 1447 BCE. The plant is mentioned in the Mishnah, where its cultivation and use as food was described.

Theophrastus' Enquiry into Plants, described the necessity of leaching the roots and leaves before they can be eaten.

The 11th-century Mishnaic exegete Nathan ben Abraham describes the cultivation of the plant in the Levant:

'If arum is covered up with earth in the Seventh Year' (Sheviit 5:2). This arum that is being covered up with earth does not belong to the [prohibition of] Seventh Year produce, but is rather from last year's produce. Its manner is such that when it smells the smell of moisture it sprouts. Therefore, they would bury great quantities [of this plant] together and cover them up with dry earth, and the members of one's household would transfer its leaves to [a place] beneath a roof, so that they will not sprout in the Seventh Year. 'When arum has remained after the Seventh Year' (Sheviit 5:4). This arum is the kind that is called qalqās (Taro), being similar to [the leaves of] ar-rakaf (Cyclamen), but this is better than it, and its leaves are eaten immediately after sprouting, and it grows quickly, but its roots which are the [plant's] main fruit does not finish [its growth] and is suitable [for replanting] even after three years [from the time that it is uprooted and buried in dry soil].

A restaurant in Toronto named Louf after the plant was established in 2025 by Fadi Kattan.

== Bibliography ==
- Łuczaj, Łukasz; Emre, Gizem (2025-02-13). "Lords-and-Ladies (Arum) as Food in Eurasia: A Review". Plants. 14 (4): 577. Bibcode:2025Plnts..14..577L. doi:10.3390/plants14040577. eISSN 2223-7747. PMC 11859539.
- Abu-Reidah, Ibrahim M. (April 2015). "Comprehensive metabolite profiling of Arum palaestinum (Araceae) leaves by using liquid chromatography–tandem mass spectrometry" (PDF). Food Research International. 70: 74–86. doi:10.1016/j.foodres.2015.01.023. eISSN 1873-7145.
- Gibernau, Marc; Macquart, David; Przetak, Gilles (2004). "Pollination in the genus Arum – a review" (PDF). Aroideana. 27: 148–166. ISSN 0197-4033.
- Kite, Geoffrey C.; et al. (2000). "Inflorescence odours and pollinators of Arum and Amorphophallus (Araceae)" (PDF). Reproductive Biology in Systematics, Conservation and Economic Botany. pp. 295–315. ISBN 1900347628.
- Hruby, Johann (1912). "Le genre Arum: Aperçu systématique avec considérations spéciales sur les relations phylogénétiques des formes" [The Genus Arum: A Systematic Overview with Special Considerations on the Phylogenetic Relations of its Forms]. Bulletin de la Société botanique de Genève II (in French) (4). Geneva: 113–160. ISSN 0366-3108.
- Fitch, Walter Hood (1883). "Arum palaestinum". Curtis's Botanical Magazine. Vol. 91. p. 5509. ISSN 1355-4905.
