= Codex Sassoon =

Codex Sassoon may refer to various ancient manuscripts or codices in the collection of David Solomon Sassoon.

Notable codices include:

- Codex Sassoon 507, the Damascus Pentateuch
- Codex Sassoon 1053, also known as Codex S1
