= Sassoon =

Sassoon may refer to:

- Sassoon (name)
- Sassoon (typeface)
- David Sassoon Library, in Mumbai, India
- Sassoon Docks, in Mumbai, India
- Sassoon Eskell (1860–1932), Iraqi statesman and financier
- Sassoon Road, in Hong Kong
