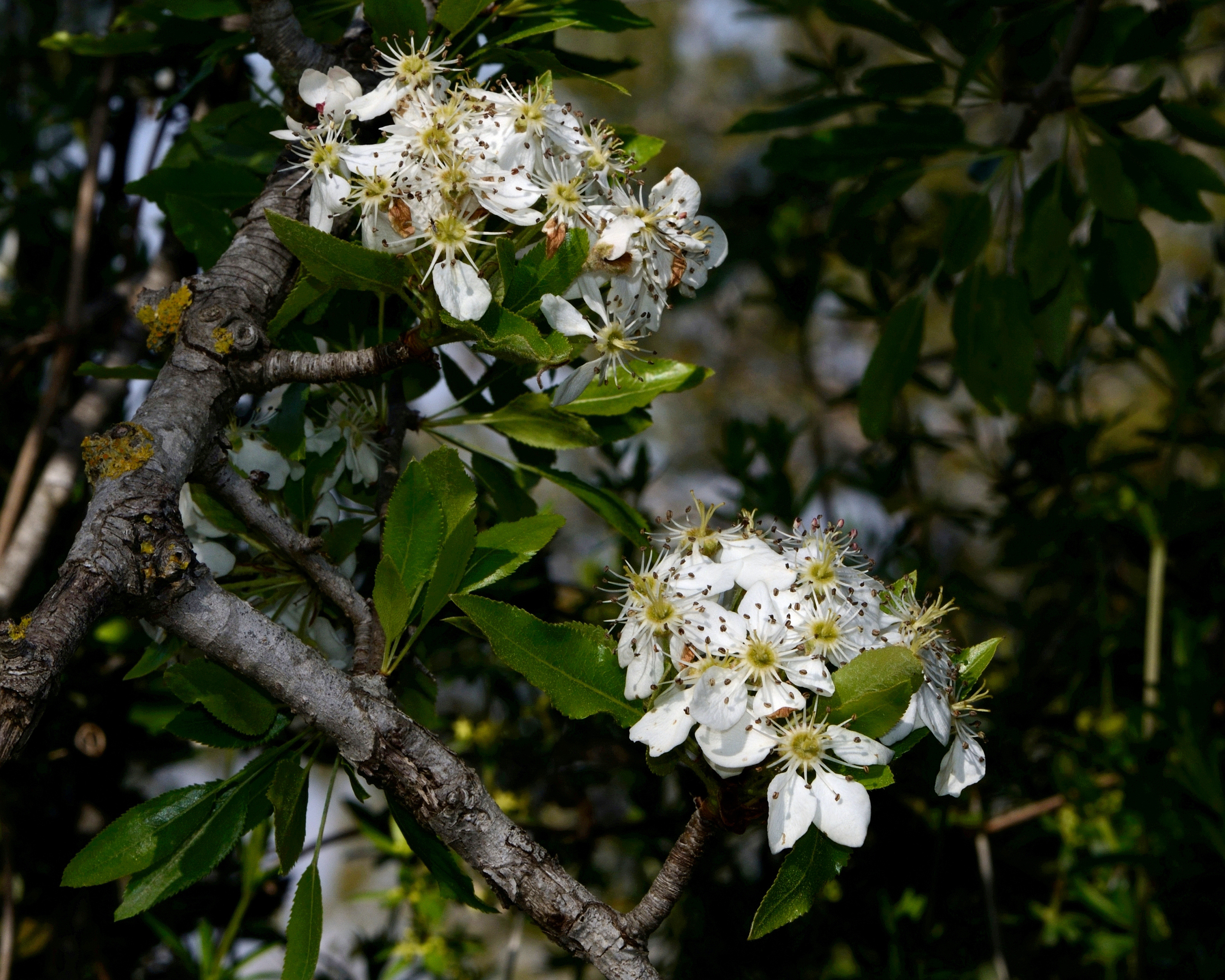

Conservation status
- Least Concern (IUCN 3.1)

Scientific classification
- Kingdom: Plantae
- Clade: Embryophytes
- Clade: Tracheophytes
- Clade: Spermatophytes
- Clade: Angiosperms
- Clade: Eudicots
- Clade: Rosids
- Order: Rosales
- Family: Rosaceae
- Genus: Pyrus
- Species: P. syriaca

Binomial name
- Pyrus syriaca Boiss.

Synonyms
- Pyrus boveana Decne.; Pyrus bovei Steud.

= Pyrus syriaca =

Species of flowering plant

Pyrus syriaca, commonly known as the Syrian pear, is a deciduous tree in the family Rosaceae.

The tree grows up to 13 metres (43 ft) tall with a broad, sometimes irregular crown. It features reddish-brown to grey branches marked by small lenticels, elliptic to ovate leaves with toothed margins, and white five-petalled flowers that appear in loose clusters during late April to early May. Its fruits are greenish-yellow pomes ranging from nearly spherical to broadly pear-shaped, maturing from late August through October.

Native to the eastern Mediterranean region and adjacent areas, its range extends from southern Turkey and the Transcaucasus through Cyprus, western Syria, northeastern Iraq, Lebanon, western Jordan, and into southwestern Iran. The species favours dry, well-drained habitats, often growing on sun-exposed, rocky slopes and in open oak forests, sometimes forming nearly pure stands alongside almond, maple, and hawthorn trees.

== Description ==
Pyrus syriaca is a deciduous tree reaching up to 13 metres (43 ft) tall, with a broad, sometimes irregular crown. The branches are reddish‑brown to grey and marked by small, lens‑shaped openings called lenticels. Buds are broadly oval (3–7 mm long), initially covered in soft hairs that soon wear away, while young shoots bear a silky, dense pubescence (sericeous) that becomes glabrous (hairless) with age. Leaves vary from long‑elliptic to ovate or lanceolate, seldom oblanceolate, measuring 1–10 by 0.8–4 cm; the broadest part typically lies at or just below the middle. Leaf margins are toothed (crenate to serrate), each tooth ending in a small, deciduous callous. The upper surface is glossy and hairless; the lower surface carries sparse, short hairs that tend to disappear as the leaf matures.

Flowering occurs in late April to early May, with blossoms borne in loose clusters (corymb) of 7–20 flowers. Individual flowers span 1.5–3 cm across, each with five white, orbicular to obovate petals (8–14 by 6–12 mm) anchored by a short stalk (claw) to a cup‑shaped hypanthium densely clothed in hairs. Sepals are triangular to linear (4–7 mm long), acute at the tip, and tomentose on both surfaces. Typically five styles up to 8 mm long and 20–35 stamens arranged in one or two concentric rings fill the flower cup.

Mature fruits are pomes that range from nearly spherical to broadly pear‑shaped (1.5–3.5 by 1.5–3.5 cm), greenish‑yellow when ripe. The persistent sepals remain appressed to the fruit surface. Each pome is borne on a thickened stalk (pedicel) that often widens below the fruit, giving it extra support. Fruit matures from late August through October.

== Habitat and distribution ==
Pyrus syriaca occupies dry, well‑drained habitats across the eastern Mediterranean and adjacent regions. Its range extends from southern Turkey and the southern Transcaucasus through Cyprus, western Syria, northeastern Iraq, Lebanon and western Jordan, reaching into southwestern Iran.

Within Iran—where it is the most widespread pear species—it grows on dry slopes in open forests of the Zagros Mountains. There, it grows alongside other species of pear and oaks. In the Arasbaran area of northeastern Iran, it occurs in denser woodland with other pears, oaks, hornbeam and elm.
