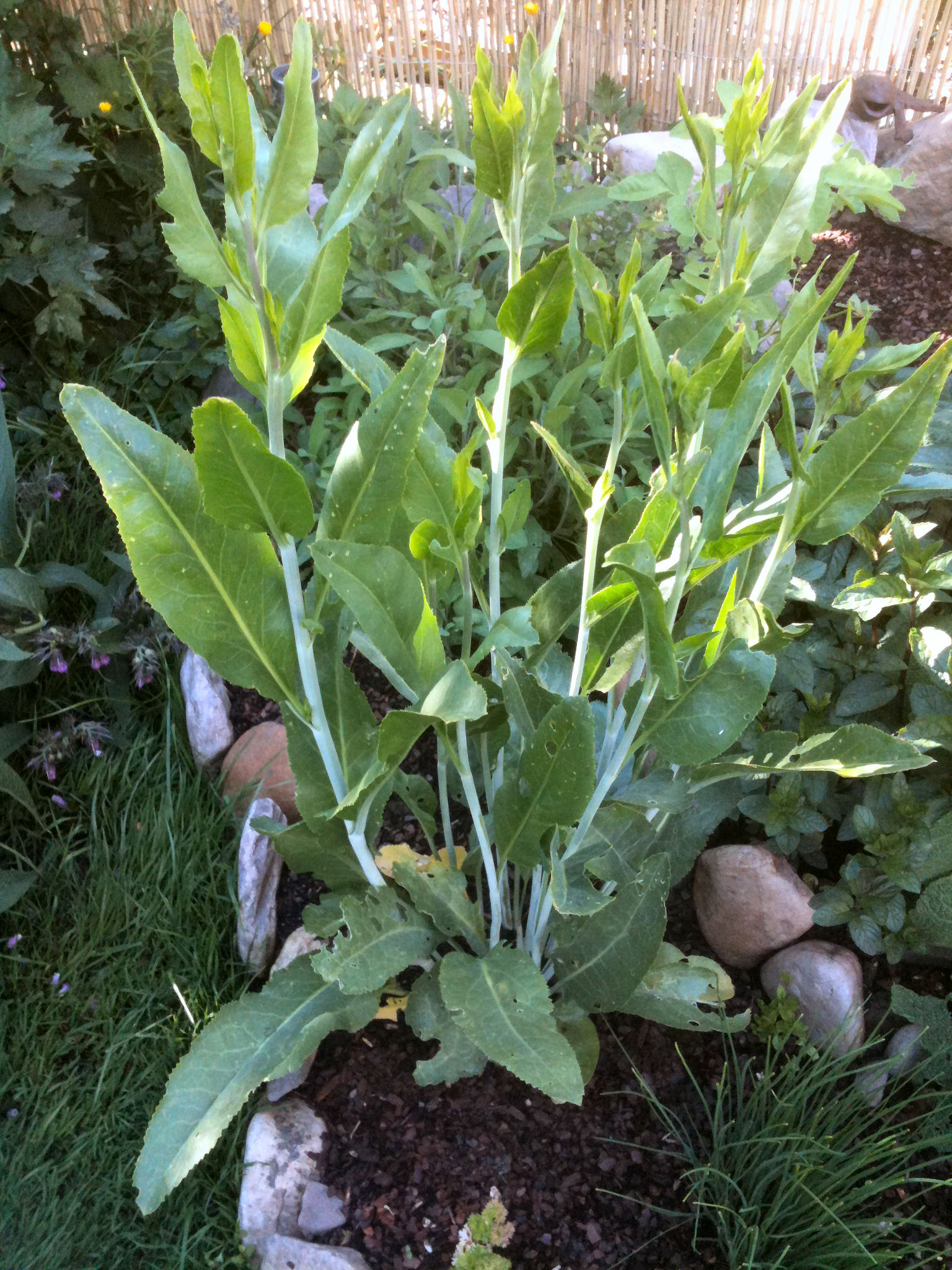

Scientific classification
- Kingdom: Plantae
- Clade: Tracheophytes
- Clade: Angiosperms
- Clade: Eudicots
- Clade: Rosids
- Order: Brassicales
- Family: Brassicaceae
- Genus: Lepidium
- Species: L. latifolium

Binomial name
- Lepidium latifolium L.

= Lepidium latifolium =

Species of flowering plant

Lepidium latifolium, known by several common names including perennial pepperweed, broadleaved pepperweed, pepperwort, peppergrass, dittander, dittany, and tall whitetop, is a perennial plant that is a member of the mustard and cabbage family.

== Description ==
Lepidium latifolium normally grows to 30–100 cm (12–39 in), but may grow as tall as 2 m (6.6 ft). It has numerous woody stems, alternating waxy leaves and clusters of small white flowers. It produces small (1.6 mm) fruits which each contain two reddish seeds. It has an extensive root network, known to reach 9 ft (2.7 m) in depth, and constituting 40% of the total biomass of the plant.

== Distribution ==
This plant is native to southern Europe, Mediterranean countries and Asia as far east as the Himalayas. It is an introduced species in Australia and North America, growing throughout the United States and Mexico. It may have been introduced to the U.S. when its seed got into a shipment of sugar beet seeds.

== Invasive plant ==
The plant is most invasive in wetland habitats, including riparian zones; from there it easily spreads to other ecosystems, such as sagebrush. It is perceived as a threat to salt marshes in southern New Hampshire, prompting the Department of Environmental Services and the U.S. Fish and Wildlife Service to look for it in the Hampton–Seabrook Estuary in 2008, where it is thought to have spread. The agencies were recruiting volunteers to help look for and properly remove it from this area. It is also a pest in the Monte Vista and Alamosa National Wildlife Refuges in Colorado and Malheur National Wildlife Refuge in Oregon, and many other sites.

== Uses ==
The leaves, shoots, and fruits of this plant are all edible. In Ladakh in the Himalayas, the spring leaves are prized as a vegetable. The peppery edge or bitterness is removed by first boiling the young shoots and leaves, and then soaking in water for two days. Cooked like spinach, it makes a nutritious vegetable.

The dried stems are sometimes used in flower arrangements.
