= Arthur Sassoon =

English banker and socialite

- Born: Arthur Abraham David Sassoon; 25 May 1840
- Died: 13 March 1912 (aged 71); Leighton Buzzard, Bedfordshire
- Resting place: Golders Green Jewish Cemetery, London
- Occupation: Banker
- Spouse: Eugenie Louise Perugia
- Parent(s): David Sassoon; Farha (Hyeem) Sassoon

Arthur Abraham David Sassoon MVO (25 May 1840 – 13 March 1912) was an English banker and socialite.

== Biography ==
=== Early life ===
Arthur Abraham David Sassoon was born on 25 May 1840. He was the fifth son of David Sassoon (1792–1864), a Jewish trader of cotton and opium in China who served as the Treasurer of Baghdad from 1817 to 1829. His mother was Farha (Hyeem) Sassoon (1814–1886), a philanthropist. One of his brothers was Reuben David Sassoon (1835–1905), a banker, and Sir Edward Sassoon, 2nd Baronet, of Kensington Gore was his uncle.

=== Career ===
He was an original member of the Board of Directors of the Hong Kong Bank, which later became known as The Hongkong and Shanghai Banking Corporation, the Hong Kong subsidiary of HSBC (LSE: HSBA; NYSE: HSBC). For many years he was a director of David Sassoon & Company of Leadenhall Street, London, a trading company founded by his brother Reuben David Sassoon.

=== Personal life ===
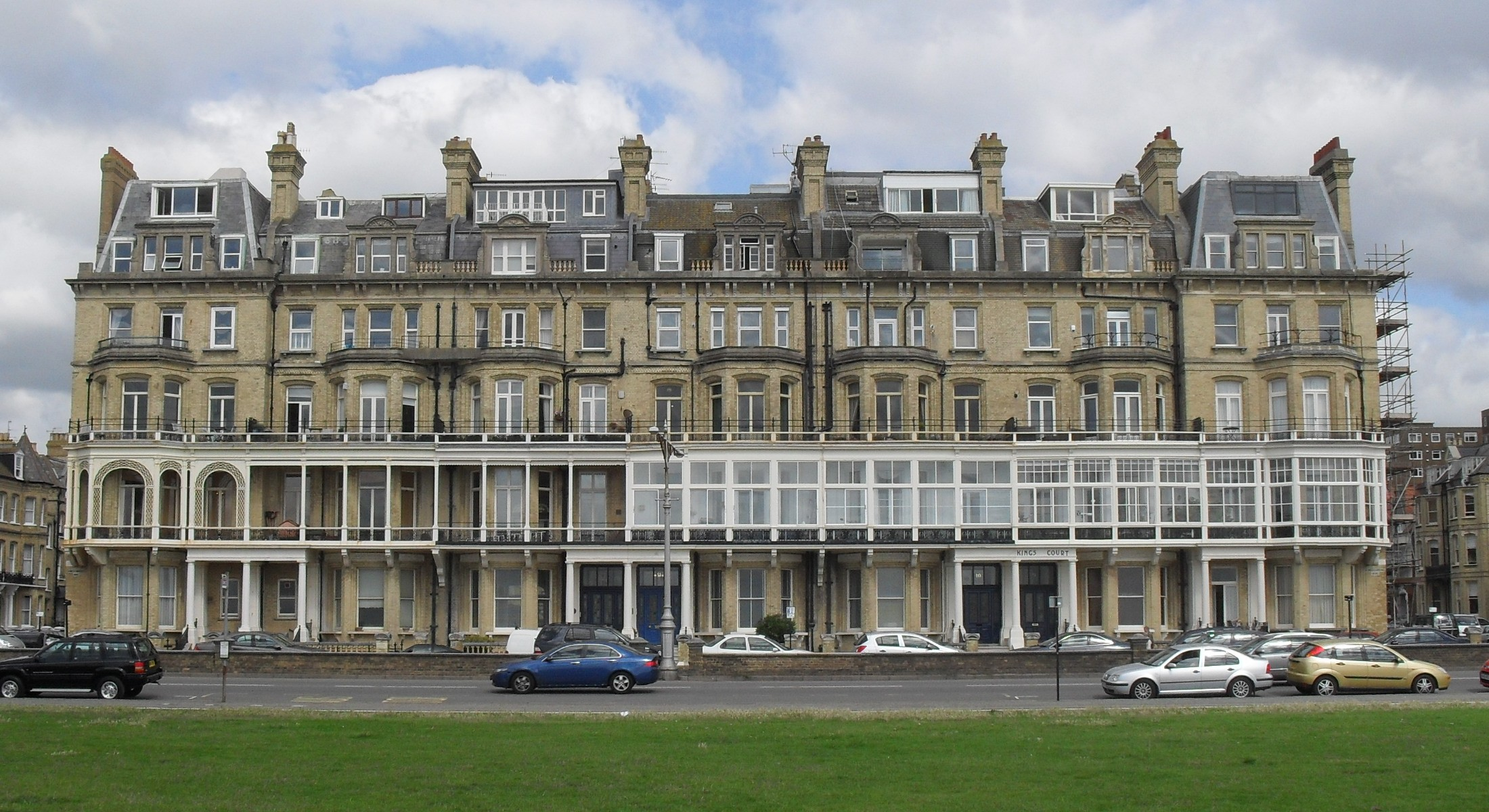
8–14 King's Gardens, Hove. Arthur and his wife resided at number 8.

In 1873, he married (Eugenie) Louise Perugia (1854–1943), daughter of Signor Achille Perugia of Trieste, Italy, whose sister Marie Perugia (1862–1937) was married to Leopold de Rothschild (1845–1917). The couple lived at Albert Gate, Knightsbridge. Louise became a leading socialite in London high society, and her work with poor Jewish girls led to her being appointed CBE. Her portrait was painted by George Frederic Watts (1817–1904) in 1882. It is displayed in Tate Britain.

For many years the couple resided in Hove, East Sussex. In 1881 they were recorded as living at 6 Queen's Gardens, part of a sea-facing terrace of seven late-19th-century mansions. (These were damaged by bombs in World War II and demolished in the 1960s; flats called Kingsway Court now occupy the site.) With a staff of 13 servants, cooks and butlers, they were "one of the largest employers of domestic staff in Hove". Sassoon's brother Reuben lived next door at number 7. From 1883 until Arthur Sassoon's death, they lived at 8 King's Gardens, a Grade II-listed building.

Sassoon was a personal friend and confidante of King Edward VII (1841–1910). The King would often stay with him on his visits to Brighton, sometimes to visit his mistress Alice Keppel (1868–1947). Moreover, Arthur Sassoon would accompany him on day trips to the Worthing Pier and the gardens of Beach House, the private residence of Sir Edmund Giles Loder, 2nd Baronet (1849–1920). Another guest was Captain Sir Richard Francis Burton (1821–1890). Known visits by the King to the Sassoons' house were in 1898, 1907, 1908 and 1910, but other visits are believed to have gone unrecorded. He felt his bronchitis and asthma improved when he visited the Sussex coast, so his visits were not merely social. Edward VII was also an occasional guest of Arthur Sassoon at Tulchan Lodge, Advie, Morayshire, during the shooting season on the Scottish moors. After the King's death in May 1910, Arthur Sassoon paid £100 towards a memorial sculpture. The Peace Statue, also known as the King Edward VII Memorial Statue, was designed by Newbury Abbot Trent and unveiled in 1912 on the seafront at the ancient parish boundary of Brighton and Hove.

He died on 13 March 1912 while staying at the Leighton Buzzard home of Leopold de Rothschild, his brother-in-law. Sassoon's photogravure, done by Walker & Boutall in 1897, rests in the National Portrait Gallery in London. He is also commemorated by four stained glass windows in the Middle Street Synagogue, Brighton. His fortune, which exceeded £650,000, passed to the children of his brother Reuben.

Both Brighton and Hove were closely associated with the Sassoon family in the 19th and 20th centuries. Henry Labouchère once quipped "Brighton is a sea-coast town, three miles long and three yards broad, with a Sassoon at each end and one in the middle". This referred to Albert Sassoon at the east end, Reuben Sassoon in the middle and Arthur Sassoon at the west end.
