= Solomon David Sassoon (1841–1894) =

Baghdadi Jewish Indian businessman and philanthropist

Solomon David Sassoon (1841–1894) was a Baghdadi Jewish Indian businessman and philanthropist.

== Biography ==
=== Early life ===
Solomon David Sassoon was born in Bombay, India in 1841.

=== Career ===
He went to China as an assistant to his father David Sassoon, and later served as head of David Sassoon & Co. until his death. He also served as Chairman of the Sassoon Spinning and Weaving Co. and the Sassoon and Alliance Silk Co.. He also served as Chairman of the Board of the Port Canning and Land Improvement Co. and the Oriental Life Assurance Co., two Joint-stock companies.

He sat on the board of directors of the Bank of Bombay and the Mumbai Port Trust. Sir James Fergusson, 6th Baronet (1832–1907) appointed him twice to the Council of the Governor of Bombay.

=== Philanthropy ===
He was President of the Bombay branch of the Anglo-Jewish Association from 1894. An Orthodox Jew, he had a private synagogue in his home.

=== Personal life ===
He married Flora Sassoon (1859–1936). They had three children:

- David Solomon Sassoon (1880–1942; had a son, Solomon David Sassoon (1915–1985), and grandson, Isaac S.D. Sassoon)
- Rachel Sassoon Ezra (1877–1952, married Sir David Ezra)
- Mozelle (1884–1921)

He died in Bombay in 1894. After his death, his wife Flora took over David Sassoon & Co. and eventually moved to England with the children.
