= Flora Sassoon =

Indian Jewish philanthropist, businesswoman and scholar

- Born: Flora (Farha) Gubbay; 18 November 1856; Bombay, India
- Died: 14 January 1936 (aged 76); London
- Resting place: Mount of Olives Cemetery, Jerusalem
- Occupations: Hebraist businesswoman Philanthropist
- Spouse: Solomon David Sassoon
- Children: 3 ( 1 son + 2 daughter); David Solomon Sassoon; Rachel Sassoon; Mozelle Sassoon
- Parent(s): Ezekiel Abraham; Aziza Sassoon
- Relatives: Sassoon family

Flora Sassoon (18 November 1856 – 14 January 1936) was a Jewish Indian businesswoman, scholar, Hebraist and philanthropist.

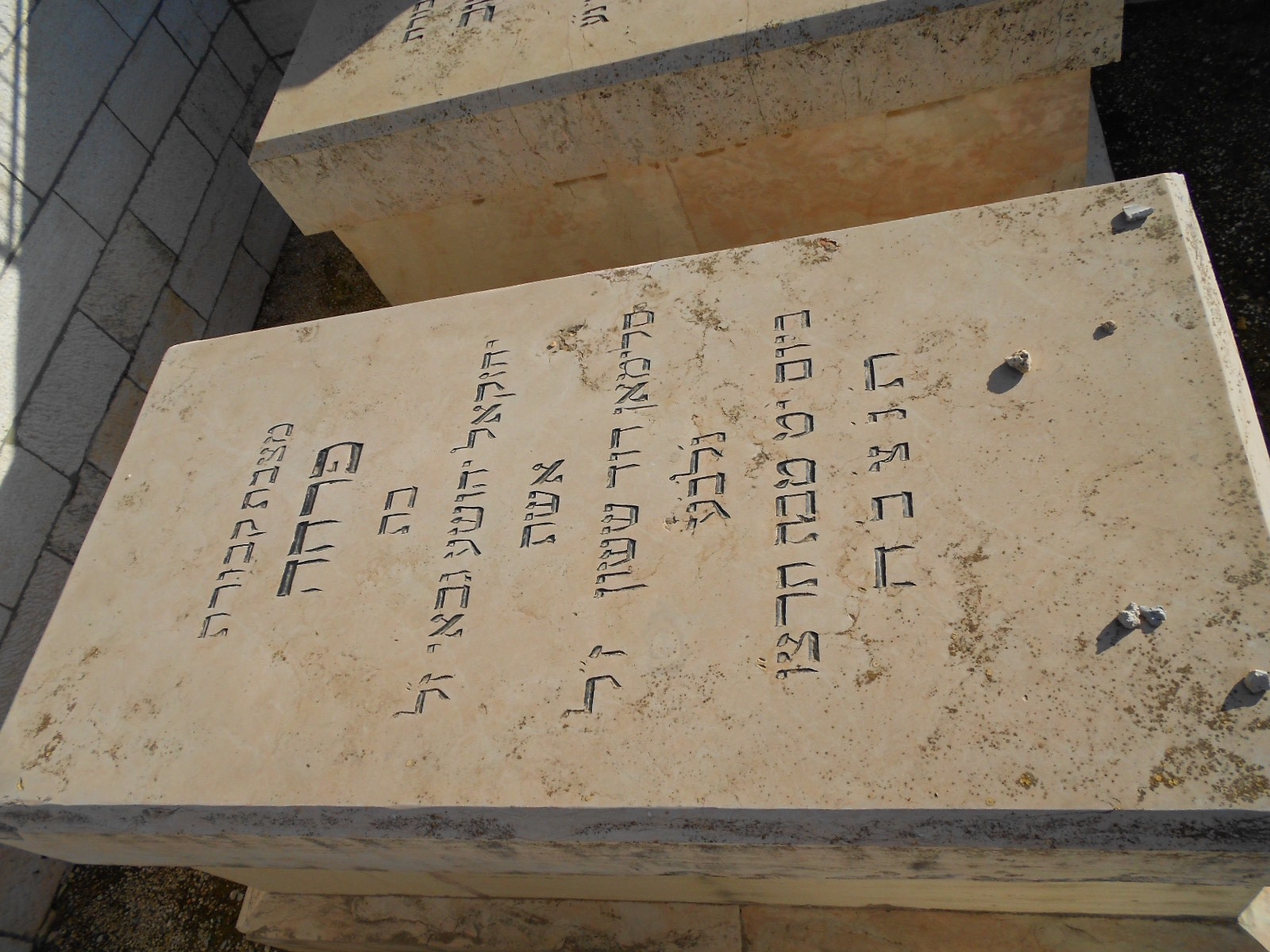
Tombstone at the Mount of Olives Jewish Cemetery in Jerusalem, Israel.

== Early life ==
Flora (Farha) Gubbay was born in 1856 in Bombay, India. Her father was Ezekiel Abraham Gubbay (1824–1896), a trader and businessman whom had come to India from Baghdad, Iraq, and her mother was Aziza Sassoon (1839–1897). Her maternal grandfather was Albert Abdullah David Sassoon (1818–1896).

As a result, her maternal great-grandfather was David Sassoon (1792–1864), a leading trader of cotton and opium who served as the treasurer of Baghdad between 1817 and 1829, and her maternal great-grandmother was his first wife, Hannah Joseph (1792–1826). She had five siblings (and half siblings with the first wife of her grand father).

She attended a Catholic girl's school and was also tutored privately by rabbis from Baghdad. By the age of seventeen, she can speak multiple languages—Hebrew, Aramaic, Hindustani, English, French and German. The Cairns Post described her as one of the world's most learned women.

== Career and civic activities ==
Sassoon took over her husband's trading business in India, David Sassoon & Company, shortly after his death.

An observant orthodox Jew, she always travelled with her own prayer quorum of ten Jewish male adults and was a strong supporter of the Balfour Declaration and a staunch zionist. She also studied the Torah and wrote articles about Rashi, who were published in The Jewish Forum.

In 1924, she presided over the Annual Speech Day at the Jews' College, stressing the importance of a Jewish education. She often hosted Middle Eastern/Indian luncheons and dinners with Jewish cuisine, meticulously prepared following the kashrut standards. To guarantee this, she always travelled with her personal ritual slaughterer.

Whilst living in India, Sassoon was a supporter of Waldemar Haffkine (1860–1930), who invented a vaccine against cholera, and encouraged reluctant Hindus and Muslims to take it. Once she moved to England, she often donated to Jews around the world who appealed to her for money in their hours of need.

== Personal life and death ==
Sassoon married Solomon David Sassoon (1841–1894), the son of her great-grandfather David Sassoon (1792–1864) by his second wife, Farha Hyeem (1814–1886). So she married her own great-uncle (her mother's paternal uncle). They had three children:

- David Solomon Sassoon (1880–1942) married Selina Prins (1883-1967) on December 17, 1912 had two children, Flora (Farha) Feuchtwanger (1914-2000) and Solomon (Suleiman) (1915-1985).
- Rachel Sassoon Ezra (1877–1952) married Sir David Ezra)
- Mozelle Sassoon (1884–1921)

They lived in Bombay. After her husband's death, she moved to England. She and her children visited Baghdad for the Jewish High Holidays in 1910, and she was introduced by the wali of Baghdad Hussain Nadim Pasha, the Chief Rabbi Ezra Dangoor. There were correspondences in writing between the family and Hakham Joseph Hayyim, the grand sage of Baghdad, revered for his piety and known also by his celebrated work, Ben Ish Hai. The latter died in 1909 and could not have been present for the Sassoon family visit in 1910.

Sassoon died in 1936 at her mansion in London.
