= David Solomon Sassoon =

Jewish bibliophile

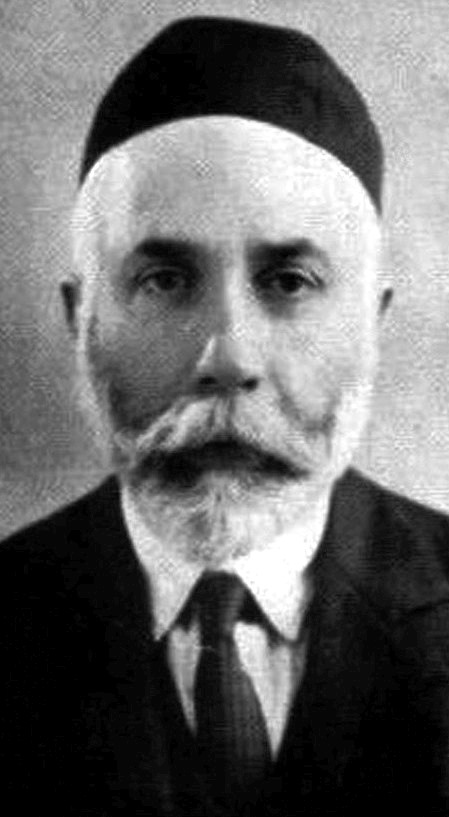
- David Solomon Sassoon
- Born: 8 December 1880; Bombay, British Raj
- Died: 10 August 1942 (aged 61)
- Resting place: Mount of Olives Jewish Cemetery
- Known for: Bibliophilia
- Children: Rabbi Solomon David Sassoon
- Parent(s): Solomon David Sassoon; Flora Sassoon
- Relatives: Sassoon family

David Solomon Sassoon (Hebrew: דוד סלימאן ששון; 8 December 1880 – 10 August 1942) (also known as "David Suleiman Sassoon"), was a bibliophile and grandson of 19th century Baghdadi Jewish community leader David Sassoon.

== Family ==
Sassoon was born in Bombay to Solomon and Flora Sassoon. He and his mother Flora moved to London in 1902, after Solomon's death in 1894.

== Manuscript collector ==
Sassoon travelled extensively with the sole intent of collecting Hebrew books and manuscripts which he later catalogued in a two-volume book, entitled, Ohel David. The importance of his private collection of books and manuscripts cannot be overestimated, since it affords scholars the opportunity to examine some twenty-four distinct liturgical rites used by the different Jewish communities of the nineteenth century: Aleppo, Ashkenazi, Egyptian, Italian, North African (Morocco), Tunis, Tlemcen, Karaite, Sefardi (Spanish), Bene Israel, Cochin, Turkish, Yemen, among others.

Sassoon originally owned some 412 manuscripts and twenty incunables, the rarest of which he retrieved from Baghdad. By 1914, the Sassoon collection numbered 500 manuscripts. Between 1914 and 1932, when the Catalogue was published, the manuscripts grew to 1,220, of which 1,153 are fully described in the Catalogue. When David and his mother visited the Holy Land in 1925, he acquired the Decisions of Rabbi Isaiah ben Mali di Trani the Elder (thirteenth century) on Hullin (MS No. 702, Cat. p. 697). One of the more important manuscripts obtained by him is Sefer Halakhot Pesuḳot of Rabbi Yehudai Gaon, a work that he obtained from a Jew in Yemen in 1911, but written in Babylon or Persia in the ninth or tenth century. Sassoon also obtained in Yemen a hand-written copy of Maimonides' Guide for the Perplexed, written in Spain in the fourteenth century (1397). Of the sixteen liturgical works (siddurim) that Sassoon obtained in Yemen, the earliest dates back to the early 16th-century (1531 CE). A study of these manuscripts reveal that the liturgy used by the Jews of Yemen underwent changes after Western influences penetrated into the Peninsula.

Perhaps the most prized of Sassoon's acquisitions is the Farhi Bible, a codex with more than 359 illustrations which he purchased in Aleppo. It is said to have been written by Elisha Crescas in Provence between the years 1366 and 1383. It is now kept in a bank vault in Switzerland. Another treasure retrieved by Sassoon is the Damascus Pentateuch, a codex which he bought in Damascus in 1915, and which was acquired by the Jewish National and University Library in Jerusalem in 1975. A particularly significant acquisition in September 1923 was the Diwan of Samuel Hanagid (MS No. 589, Cat. pp. 451–460), which the Oxford University Press published with an introduction by Sassoon in 1924. Samuel ha-Levi b. Joseph ibn Nagrela (993-1056) died ten years before the Norman Conquest of England.

Many of the manuscripts and incunabula collected by Sassoon were auctioned by Sotheby's of London in Zurich and in New York, between the years 1975 - 1994, in order to satisfy the Sassoon estate's British tax obligations. Today, most of what remains of David Solomon Sassoon's private collection of Hebrew manuscripts is stored at the University of Toronto, in Canada, although a small cluster of manuscripts from his estate are now at the British Library, which were either offered to the library in lieu of tax, or were purchased at Sotheby's auction sales in the 1970s.

His son, Solomon David Sassoon (1915–1985), was an educator, Rabbi, philanthropist and fundraiser, and also a collector of Jewish manuscripts.

== Published works ==
- Sassoon, D.S. (1923). L. Blau; M. Guttmann; S. Hevesi (eds.). "Megillat Teman". Hazofeh: Quartalis Hebraica (in Hebrew). 7. Budapest: 1–14. OCLC 3723265. (reprinted by Makor Publishers Ltd., Jerusalem 1972) (OCLC 233333418)
- Sassoon, D.S. (1924). Bo'ī Teman (in Hebrew). Budapest: Meshulam Zalman u-Menaḥem ha-Kohen Ḳaṭtsburg. OCLC 56776926.
- Sassoon, D.S. (1931). On the Origins of the Jews in Yemen (לקורות היהודים בתימן) (in Hebrew). Budapest. OCLC 19182661.
- Sassoon, D.S. (1932). Ohel Dawid - Descriptive Catalogue of the Hebrew and Samaritan Manuscripts in the Sassoon Library. Vol. 1–2. London: Oxford University Press. OCLC 912964204.
- Sassoon, D.S. (1949). A History of the Jews in Baghdad. Letchworth: Published posthumously by his son Solomon David Sassoon. p. 236.

== See also ==
- Sassoon family
- Codex Sassoon
- Codex Sassoon 1053
