= Reuben Sassoon =

English businessman

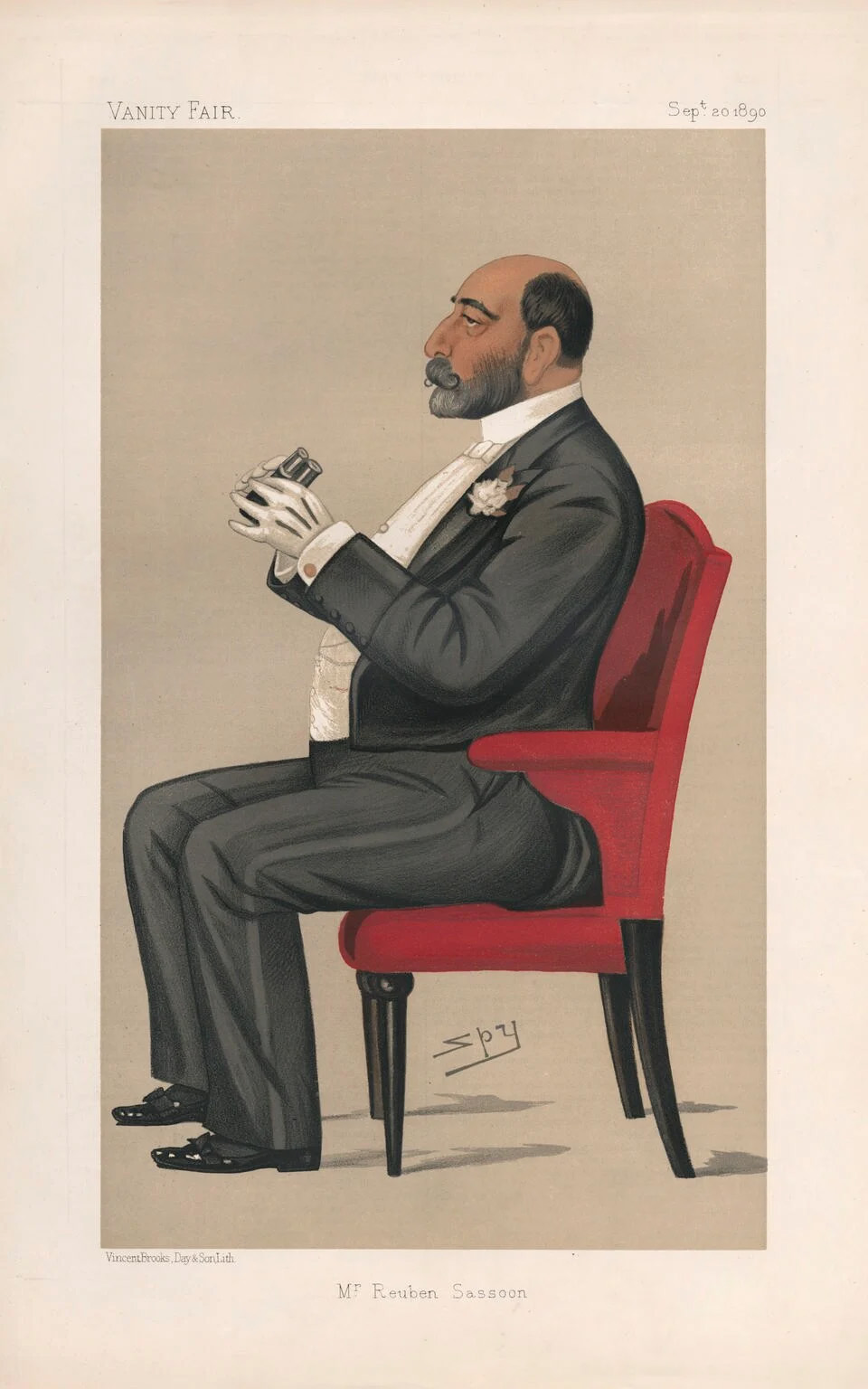
- Caricature in Vanity Fair, 20 September 1890
- Born: Reuben David Sassoon; 1835; Baghdad
- Died: 1905 (aged 69–70)
- Occupation: Businessman
- Spouse: Catherine Sassoon
- Children: 6
- Parent(s): David Sassoon; Farha (Hyeem) Sassoon

Reuben David Sassoon, MVO (1835–1905) was an English businessman.

== Biography ==
=== Early life ===
Reuben David Sassoon was born in 1835 in Baghdad. His father was David Sassoon (1792–1864), a Jewish trader of opium and cotton in China who served as the Treasurer of Baghdad from 1817 to 1829. One of his brothers was Arthur Sassoon (1840–1912).

=== Career ===
He worked for his father's company, serving as director of David Sassoon & Co. for East India and China.

By 1865, he also served on the board of directors of the China Steamship and Labuan Coal Company alongside T. C. Bruce, Sir J. D. Elphinstone, Harry Borradaile, H. B. Loch, Henry Alers Hankey, William Miller, Edward Pereira, G. Lathom Brown, Alexander Sinclair, James N. Daniel and John Hickie.

In 1890 he was a guest at Tranby Croft, and was the croupier for the Prince of Wales on the successive nights of the royal Baccarat scandal. He saw nothing amiss.

=== Judaism ===
Together with Abraham Jacob David and Marcus David Ezekiel, he was involved with the Ohel Leah Synagogue near Staunton Street in Hong Kong by 1898. During his life, David also acquired ritual objects from Levi Salomons, a British financier, which he added to his existing collection that his family had brought with them from the Far East.

=== Personal life ===
He was married to Catherine Sassoon (1838–1906). They resided at 7 Queens Gardens (now demolished) in Brighton & Hove, East Sussex. They had six children:

- Rachel Sassoon (1860)
- Luna Sassoon (1866)
- David Reuben Sassoon (1867)
- Mozelle Sassoon (1869)
- Flora Cecilia Sassoon
- Judith Louise Sassoon (1874–1964)

He died in 1905. His wife died a year later, in 1906, and she was buried in the Novo Beth Chaim Cemetery in Mile End, East London. Photographers Maull & Fox took his portrait in costume as a Persian prince for the Duchess of Devonshire's 1897 fancy-dress ball. A photogravure of his portrait by Walker & Boutall was printed in an album of portraits of some of the people who attended the ball; a copy of that album now rests in the National Portrait Gallery in London.
