= Simeon Kayyara =

Simeon Kayyara, also spelled Shimon Kiara (Hebrew: שמעון קיירא), was a Jewish-Babylonian halakhist of the first half of the 8th century. Although he lived during the Geonic period, he was never officially appointed as a Gaon, and therefore does not bear the title "Gaon".

Rabbinic sources often refer to Kayyara as Bahag, an abbreviation of Ba'al Halakhot Gedolot ("author of the Halakhot Gedolot"), after his most important work.

== Name ==
The early identification of his surname with "Qahirah," the Arabic name of Cairo (founded 980), was shown by Solomon Judah Loeb Rapoport to be impossible. Neubauer's suggestion of its identification with Qayyar in Mesopotamia is equally untenable. It is now assumed that "Kayyara" is derived from a common noun, and, like the Syro-Arabic "qayyar," originally denoted a dealer in pitch or wax.

== Halakhot Gedolot ==
According to both medieval authorities like Geonim Sherira and Hai ben Sherira, and modern scholars like Abraham Epstein, Kayyara is the author of Halachot Gedolot (הלכות גדולות), a work on Jewish law dating from the Geonic period. However, others have attributed the work to Yehudai Gaon.
