= Yehudai ben Nahman =

8th-century rabbi

Yehudai ben Nahman (or Yehudai Gaon; Hebrew: יהודאי גאון, sometimes: Yehudai b. Nahman) was the head of the yeshiva in Sura from 757 to 761, during the Geonic period of Judaism. He was originally a member of the academy of Pumbedita, but Exilarch Solomon ben Hisdai appointed him as Gaon of Sura as "there is no one there (at Sura) as distinguished as he is for wisdom".

He waged a strong campaign, continued by his disciple Pirqoi ben Baboi, for the acceptance of the Babylonian Talmud as the standard for Jewish law in all countries. This was opposed by the Jews of Eretz Yisrael, who relied on the Jerusalem Talmud and their own older traditions. Yehudai argued that, as a result of Byzantine persecution, the Jews of Eretz Yisrael had only preserved Jewish tradition in a fragmentary and unreliable form.

== Works ==
The book Halachot Pesukot, which discusses those halachot that were practiced in the diaspora since the destruction of the Second Temple, has been attributed to Gaon, although this has been disputed by scholars. The text, which is generally organized along the same pattern as the tractates of the Babylonian Talmud, was the subject of many abridgements and summaries. The original was lost for many years, and was only known in the form of a Hebrew paraphrase called Hilchot Re'u (published Versailles 1886), until it was discovered in a Yemenite manuscript purchased in 1911 and published in Jerusalem in 1951.

Halachot Ketzuvot is attributed to him, in which he ruled that women should, among other things, submit silently to beatings by their husbands; no other parallel by the Babylonian gaonim has been found. However the legitimacy of this text has also been called into question; many anonymous sources from the Geonic period were attributed to Yehudai Gaon by sages from the Middle Ages because of his great standing and influence. A critical edition of this work was published by Mordecai Margalioth in 1942.

== Halachot Gedoloth controversy ==
One rabbinic school of thought credits him with authorship of the Halachot Gedolot, or of the core of it, though it is generally agreed that the final form of that work is to be attributed to Simeon Kayyara. Based on anachronistic discrepancies, the Semag's opinion that it was Yehudai Gaon who composed the work Halachot Gedoloth was thought to be an error. Rabbi David Gans may have been the first to suggest that the Semag, in referring to "Rav Yehudai" as the author, was actually alluding to Yehudai Hakohen ben Ahunai, Gaon of the Sura Academy (served 4519 - 4524 of the Hebrew calendar).

At all events the Halachot Pesukot was an important source for the larger work.

Preceded by Achai Gaon	Gaon of the Sura Academy; 757-761	Succeeded by Ahhunai Kahana ben Papa
