= Solomon David Sassoon =

British educator and rabbi

Solomon David Sassoon (14 August 1915 – 27 May 1985) was an educator, Rabbi, philanthropist, fundraiser, and collector of Jewish manuscripts.

== Biography ==
=== Early life ===
Solomon David Sassoon was born in August 1915 in London into the wealthy Sassoon family. His father was David Solomon Sassoon (1880–1942), a collector of Hebrew manuscripts whose father hailed from Baghdad. His paternal grandmother was Flora Sassoon. His paternal great-grandfather was Albert Abdullah David Sassoon (1818–1896), and his paternal great-great-grandfather was David Sassoon (1792–1864), a trader of cotton and opium who served as the treasurer of Baghdad between 1817 and 1829.

He was tutored in Talmud by Rabbi Eliyahu Eliezer Dessler.

=== Career ===
Sassoon made original contributions to linguistic analysis, philosophy, physiology and Biblical scholarship. A major contribution to the world of Hebrew Classics is the book of the son of the Maimonides, Sefer Hamaspik L'Ovdei Hashem, which he brought out in 1965 for the first Hebrew edition, in collaboration with the Arabic-Hebrew translator Rabbi Yosef Dori. In 1953 and again in 1964, he declined requests to put his name forward as a candidate for the position of Sephardi Chief Rabbi of Israel. His varied interests and literary output were maintained until his death.

=== Death and legacy ===
Solomon David Sassoon built a library in Letchworth, England, to house his father's collections of Jewish manuscripts and incunabula. Some of these holdings were later auctioned by Sotheby's of London in Zurich and in New York, between 1975 and 1994, in order to satisfy the Sassoon estate's British tax obligations. The dispersal of David Solomon Sassoon’s manuscript collection began with a series of Sotheby’s sales in 1975, 1978, 1981, and 1984, through which hundreds of Hebrew and Samaritan manuscripts passed into public and private collections in Israel, Europe, North America, and elsewhere. The dispersal has continued through subsequent auctions, resales, and institutional acquisitions into the present, with individual manuscripts now held across libraries, museums, and private collections worldwide.

Sassoon died in Jerusalem in May 1985. His son, Isaac S.D. Sassoon, is also a rabbi.

== Bibliography ==
- Reality Revisited: A New Look at Computers and Minds, Physics and Evolution, Feldheim; 2nd Revised edition (1991), ISBN 0-87306-575-1
- Natan Hokhma liShlomo: A Collection of Torah Commentary, Essays on the Talmud and Assorted Philosophical Writings (1989)
