= Mount Gerizim Temple =

Samaritan temple (5th century–c. 110 BCE)

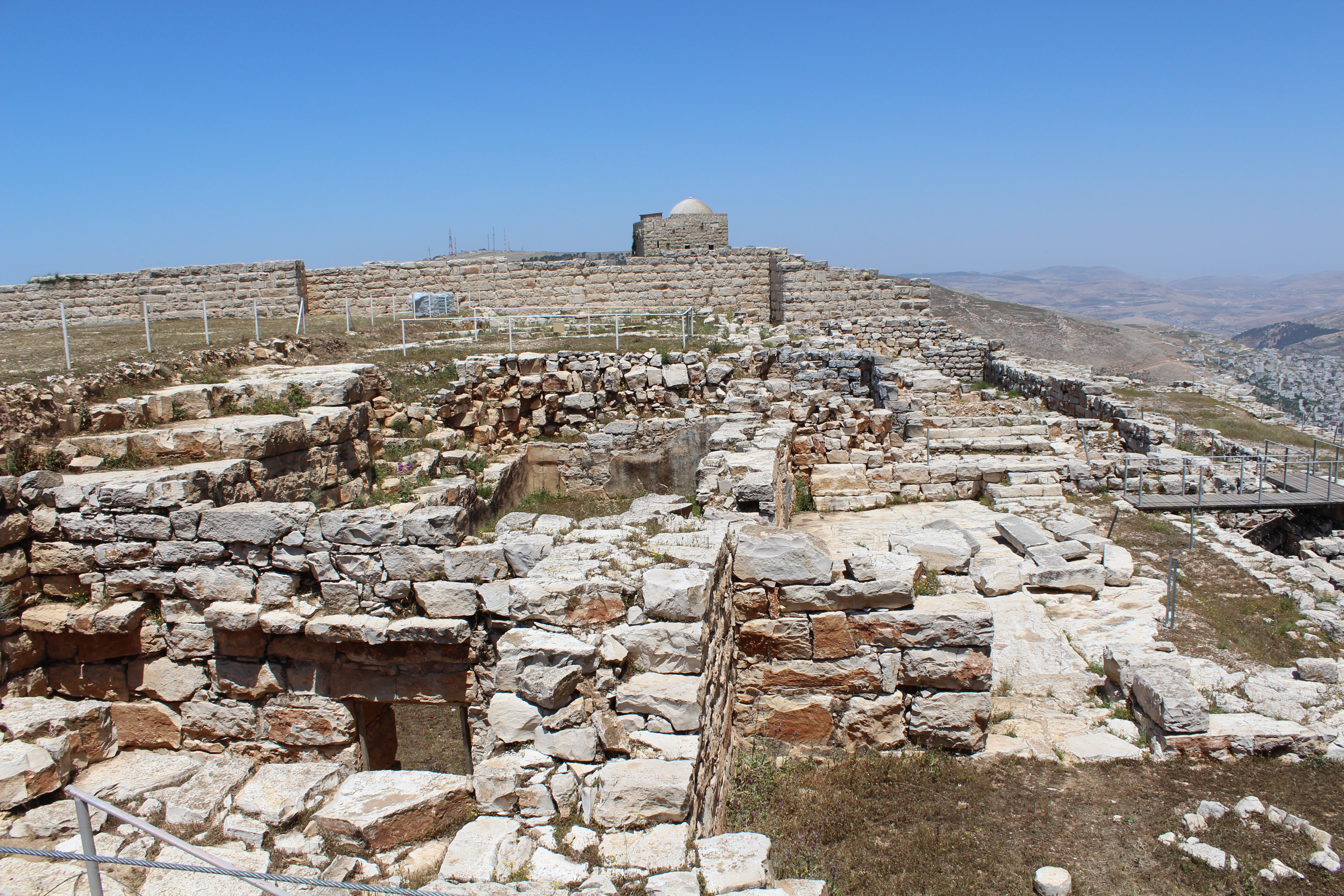
- Ruins belonging to the sanctuary

- Location within Levant

Religion
- Affiliation: Samaritanism
- Region: Samaria
- Deity: Yahweh
- Leadership: Samaritan priesthood

Location
- Location: Mount Gerizim
- Country: Achaemenid Empire (first); Hasmonean kingdom (last)
- Palestine grid: 176/178
- Coordinates: 32°12′01″N 35°16′24″E

Architecture
- Completed: 5th century BCE (original); 2nd century BCE (reconstructed)
- Destroyed: c. 110 BCE
- Excavation dates: 1983–2006
- Archaeologists: Yitzhak Magen
- Present-day site: Mount Gerizim archaeological site
- Public access: Yes

The Mount Gerizim Temple was an ancient Samaritan center of worship located on Mount Gerizim originally constructed in the mid-5th century BCE, reconstructed in the early 2nd century BCE, and destroyed later in that same century. The temple is attested in several historical sources, both literary and epigraphical, including references in 2 Maccabees from the second century BCE and two Greek inscriptions found on the island of Delos, also dating to the same period, which mention a sanctuary on the mountain. Additionally, the first-century CE historian Josephus provides an account of the temple's founding (though inaccurately dated) and its eventual destruction by Hasmonean leader John Hyrcanus c. 110 BCE.

Archaeological excavations on Mount Gerizim's main peak revealed remnants of the sacred precinct, or temenos, that enclosed the temple. During the Persian period (5th–4th centuries BCE), a small monumental sacred complex existed at the site, featuring ashlar masonry walls, courtyards, and chambers. Persian-era finds include pottery, silver jewelry, coins, and burned bones, primarily of goats, sheep, cattle, and doves, indicating sacrificial practices. The site underwent major expansion during the Hellenistic period during the reign of Antiochus III (223–187 BCE), when a large fortified town and a new sacred precinct were constructed. The Hellenistic structures were built with smooth quarried stones and included city walls, domiciles, and service buildings. According to Josephus, the temple resembled the Temple in Jerusalem. Excavations revealed thousands of coins and hundreds of inscriptions in Hebrew, Aramaic, and Greek, confirming the temple's dedication to the worship of Yahweh.

Today, Mount Gerizim retains its status as the holiest site in Samaritanism, though the temple has followed a markedly different path than its Jerusalem counterpart. While the former Jerusalem Temple remains central to Jewish theology, liturgy and historical consciousness, the Mount Gerizim temple has vanished from Samaritan memory, with modern Samaritans rejecting its historical existence altogether and interpreting the ancient remains as administrative buildings or a sacrificial compound. For Samaritans, Mount Gerizim itself is sacred, and the community gathers there for the three annual pilgrimages prescribed in the Torah, most notably during Passover when they perform the traditional sheep sacrifice atop the mountain. The current Samaritan holy site, known as "The Twelve Stones," may be situated where the temple's Holy of Holies once stood.

== History ==
=== Persian period ===
Archaeological excavations have revealed that the sanctuary on Mount Gerizim was constructed during the 5th century BCE, when the region was under Persian rule. Built at the mountain's highest point, it was the first structure erected at this sacred site and was seemingly completed around 400 BCE. While this dating is supported by the majority of scholars, alternative views also exist. For example, archaeologist Eran Arie has suggested that the structure should be dated to the late Iron Age (650–550 BCE), based on a reexamination of column capitals, pottery, and the sanctuary's six-chamber gate—all of which are comparable to findings from Iron Age sites. This evidence leads him to propose that the temple's construction may date back to this earlier period.

The discovery of the Gerizim Temple has significant historical implications, as it shows that a rival temple to the Second Jewish Temple in Jerusalem (completed c. 516 BCE) existed earlier than scholars previously believed. The findings directly challenge the account of the first-century historian Josephus, who dated the temple's construction to around 332 BCE during Alexander the Great's conquest of the region. According to Josephus, the temple was built by a Samaritan governor named Sanballat as a reward for his son-in-law Manasseh, a Jerusalem priest who had been forced by the elders of Jerusalem to choose between his marriage to Sanballat's daughter and his priestly role in the Jerusalem Temple. Sanballat, initially aligned with Darius III, later shifted his allegiance to Alexander and secured permission to build the temple by claiming it would help the king divide the nation in times of unrest. Josephus appears to have mistakenly attributed the temple's construction to a Sanballat from the time of Alexander, when in fact it should be credited to the Sanballat who lived about a century earlier, during the time of Nehemiah.

During the Persian period, the Samaritan religious and political leadership was based in the city of Samaria. Evidence suggests that the governor of Samaria did not also serve as high priest at the Mount Gerizim temple, although Josephus mentions a promise by Sanballat to his son-in-law Ephraim regarding dual secular and religious authority as high priest.

=== Hellenistic period ===
The Persian-era precinct survived Alexander the Great's conquests and subsequent suppression of revolts in Samaria. Archaeological discoveries such as tetradrachms minted in Macedonia and Sidonian didrachmas, alongside numerous coins from Ptolemy I Soter, suggest continuous habitation during this period. After Alexander's destruction of the city of Samaria, the Samaritan priestly class rose to prominence, with the high priest leading a theocratic governance that replaced the previous political leadership. Many religious leaders relocated to Mount Gerizim, establishing it as the central hub for Samaritan religion, economy, and politics. Under Ptolemaic rule (c. 301–198 BCE), a construction wave commenced on Mount Gerizim, including the establishment of the southern quarter and potentially other structures around the precinct.

The temple and precinct were reconstructed in the early second century BCE under the reign of Antiochus III (r. 222–187 BCE), as indicated by archaeological evidence. The precinct was significantly expanded using smoothly cut stones quarried from below the surface. Simultaneously, a large fortified town was established nearby, which grew to approximately 30 dunams (40.5 acres (16.4 ha)) during his rule. Josephus recounts that during the reign of Ptolemy VI Philometor (180–145 BCE), the Jewish and Samaritan communities in Alexandria were disputing over the legitimate location of the Temple—Jerusalem or Gerizim. Both groups claimed that their respective sanctuary had been built "in accordance with the laws of Moses". The persecution led by Antiochus IV Epiphanes (175–164 BCE) against the Jews initially targeted both the cult practices of the Jerusalem temple and those of the Gerizim temple. According to 2 Maccabees, the king sent an official "He was also to defile both the temple in Jerusalem and the temple on Mount Gerizim and to proclaim the former to be the temple of Zeus Olympios and the latter (in accordance with the ... of the inhabitants of the place) to be the temple of Zeus Xenios." Another excerpt in the book indicates that both sanctuaries received comparable recognition, underscoring their significance. Josephus recounts that this foreign oppression created friction between the Jews and Samaritans, as the latter convinced Antiochus that they bore no responsibility for the unrest and were not connected to the Jews.

There is a wealth of epigraphic evidence from this period that confirms the existence of a community in both Israel and the diaspora, dedicated to worship at the sanctuary on the mountain. Numerous votive inscriptions in Hebrew, Aramaic, and a few in Greek, left by pilgrims, have been discovered at the summit of the mountain. Other inscriptions at the site include one featuring the Tetragrammaton, several with priestly titles, and others containing formulaic phrases such as "before God" or "before the Lord." Additionally, two Greek inscriptions discovered on the island of Delos, dating to 150–50 BCE, mention a sanctuary on Mount Gerizim. One of them is dedicated by "the Israelites on Delos who make offerings to the temple (on) [or, to sacred] Argarizein crown with a golden wreath Sarapion, son of Jason of Knossos, for his beneficence toward them."

=== Destruction ===
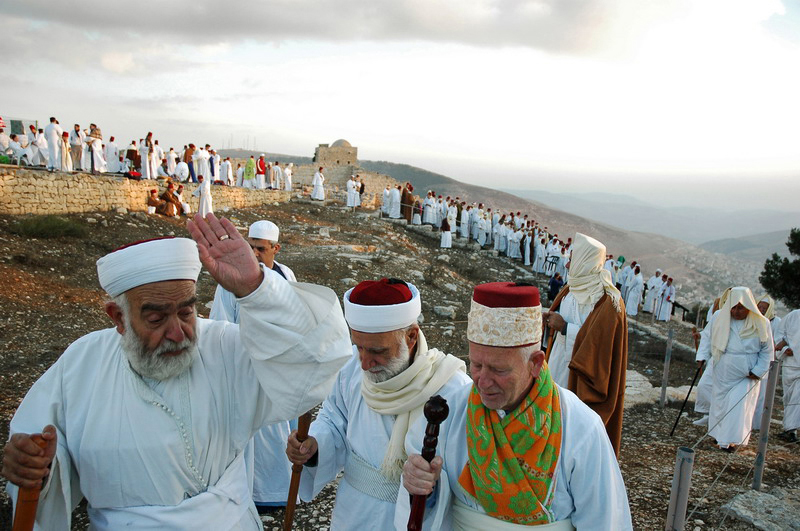
Samaritans marking Sukkot, near the site of the temple, 2005

Between 112 and 107 BCE, John Hyrcanus, the Jewish ruler of Judea and high priest, launched military campaigns to expand his state's territory. Around 111–110 BCE, as part of this effort, Hyrcanus led a campaign in Samaria that culminated in the destruction of the Samaritan temple on Mount Gerizim. The destruction is recorded only in the writings of Josephus and in Megillas Taanis; it is not mentioned in any of the Books of Maccabees or in Samaritan literature. Josephus writes that Hyrcanus conquered the "Cuthean nation" living around the temple, which he said was "modeled on that in Jerusalem." He then explains the background of the temple's construction, adding that "two hundred years later, this temple was laid waste." Investigations at the site found extensive archaeological evidence of destruction caused by fire. Based on this, Knoppers suggests that Hyrcanus had no intention of adapting or reusing the site. Along with the sanctuary, both the adjacent city and Shechem below were destroyed by Hyrcanus.

Josephus does not explain Hyrcanus's reasons for destroying the temple, prompting scholars to propose various motivations for his actions. Historian Jonathan Bourgel argues that John Hyrcanus's destruction of the Samaritan temple was not meant to exclude the Samaritans, but rather to forcibly integrate them into the Hasmonean state, and bring them under his authority as High Priest of the Jerusalem Temple. Unlike his conversion of the Idumeans, who had to adopt circumcision and Jewish laws, Hyrcanus likely saw the Samaritans as genuine Israelites rather than foreign 'Cutheans', as Josephus described them. His policy continued the process begun under Jonathan, who applied tax exemption for those offering sacrifices in Jerusalem after annexing the Samarian districts of Lydda, Aphairema, and Ramathaim, though replacing Jonathan's means of persuasion with coercion, through the destruction of the Gerizim cult. Similarly, historian Seth Schwartz adds that the Samaritans "were expected to switch their religious loyalties to the Jerusalem temple, and in return were regarded by the Judaean authorities as Jews."

According to biblical scholar Gary N. Knoppers, in destroying the Samaritan temple, Hyrcanus "not only fulfilled the centralization mandate (in Deuteronomy 12:1–13:1) but also consolidated political, sacerdotal, and economic power in Jerusalem." Knoppers writes that, due to shared characteristics, the similarities between the two sanctuaries, and the credibility of Josephus's claims about interrelated priesthoods and families, it is likely that some Samaritans turned to the Jerusalem Temple after the destruction of their own. However, as Bourgel suggests, while Hyrcanus had some success in drawing Samaritans to Jerusalem, the majority remained loyal to Mount Gerizim, and the destruction of their temple heightened their defiance, eventually leading to another policy shift which saw their exclusion from the Jerusalem Temple.

It appears that John Hyrcanus established a military garrison on the mountain, which, according to biblical scholar Stefan Schorch, aimed to prevent the Samaritans from returning and to enforce recognition of the Jerusalem Temple. This garrison remained at the site until the reign of Alexander Jannaeus or possibly later. Stefan Schorch writes that the destruction of the Samaritan temple solidified the split between Samaritans and Jews, a division that had been widening for centuries. Its significance is reflected in the Jewish text Megillat Taanit, which commemorates the event as "Mount Gerizim Day" (Yom Har Gerizim) on the 21st of Kislev, indicating it was still celebrated in first-century Jerusalem.

=== Later history ===
The sanctuary and city remained abandoned during the Hasmonean and Roman periods. While Mount Gerizim continued to hold sacred significance for the Samaritans, their attempts to reclaim control of the site proved unsuccessful. For instance, Josephus reports that in 67 CE, during the First Jewish Revolt, Roman forces under Vespasian confronted and killed a large group of Samaritans gathered on the mountain, viewing their presence as a potential rebellion. In 160 CE, Roman Emperor Antoninus Pius inaugurated a temple to Zeus on the northern ridge of Mount Gerizim, which was later completed in the early third century by the Severan dynasty (193–235). A fortress was erected nearby during the Late Roman period.

In the fourth century CE, the sacred precinct underwent partial reconstruction, as the Samaritans transformed the site into a pilgrimage destination. During the reign of Constantine I (324–337 CE), Samaritans were reportedly worshiping on Mount Gerizim. Around this time, Samaritan leader Baba Rabba built a purification well and a "house for prayer" at the mountain. Evidence from a Jewish Midrash (rabbinic biblical exegesis) and Christian sources also indicates the presence of the Samaritan holy site during this period, although it remains unclear whether the precinct functioned solely as a synagogue for prayer or if animal sacrifices were also performed as they had been during the time of the temple. This phase of activity, however, was followed by further destruction.

In 484 CE, following a Samaritan revolt prompted by the growing presence of Christianity—which reportedly involved the mutilation of a bishop in Neapolis—Emperor Zeno banished all Samaritans from Mount Gerizim and commissioned the construction of the Church of Mary Theotokos, an octagonal church dedicated to Mary, mother of Jesus, on the remnants of the sanctuary. By converting the Samaritan holiest site into a church, Zeno aimed to reinforce Christian dominance and displace the Samaritans from their sacred historical and religious center, thereby undermining the foundational beliefs of Samaritanism. This act echoes Hadrian's placement of a statue of Jupiter atop the Temple Mount centuries earlier, symbolizing his triumph over the Jews. The construction of the church and its enclosure completely demolished the Hellenistic-era precinct, leaving only its outer walls intact.

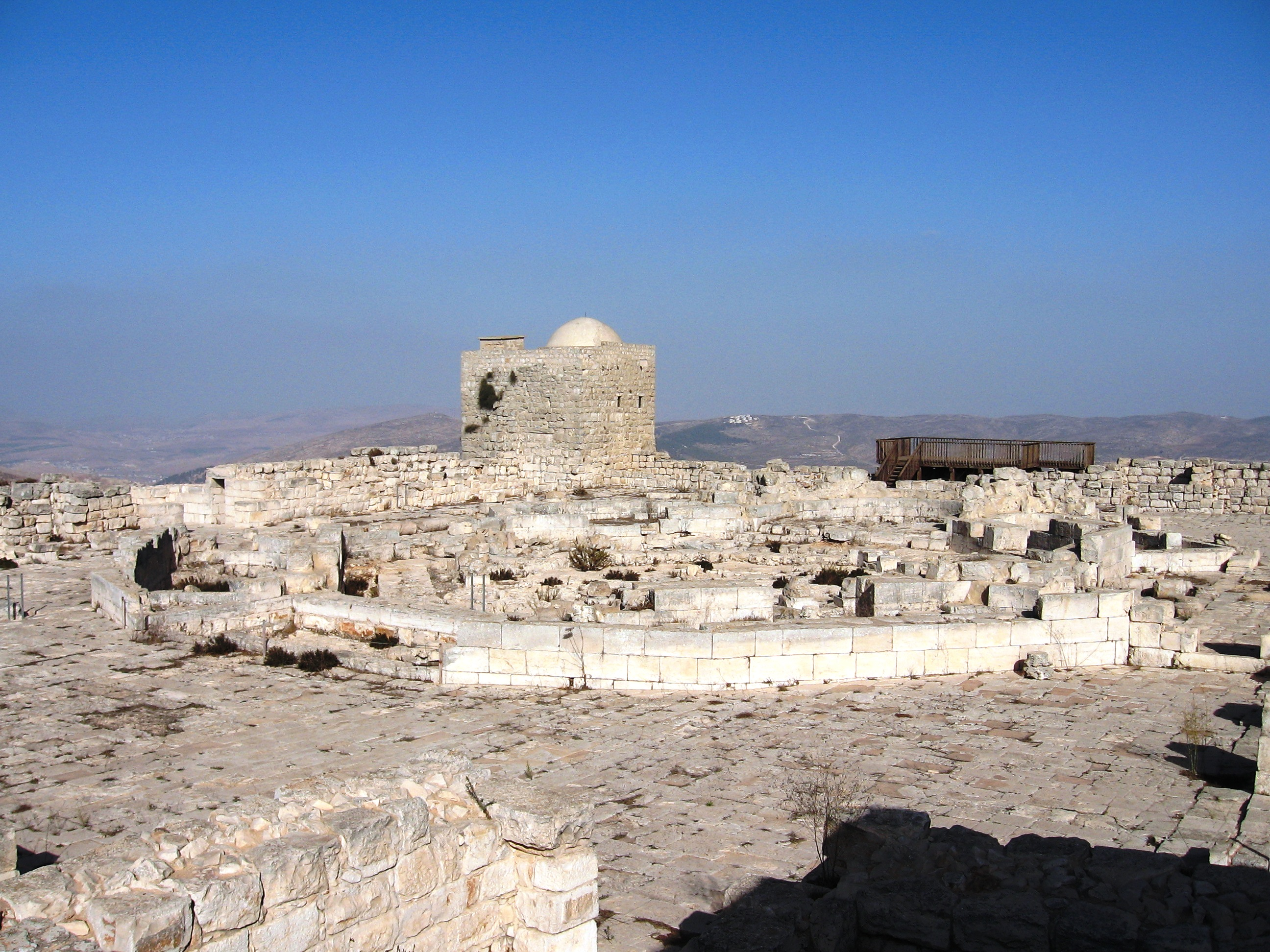
Remnants of the octagonal Church of Mary Theotokos, built around 484 CE by Byzantine Emperor Zeno over the ruins of the Samaritan sanctuary. In the background, the 16th-century tomb of Sheikh Ghanim

The Church of Mary Theotokos was later renovated and expanded by Justinian I (527–565 CE) after it was damaged in successive Samaritan uprisings. Under Justinian, the church's fortifications were also extended northward, to protect it against Samaritan attacks. Although restored in the ninth century, the church was abandoned by the mid-tenth century, eventually becoming a ruin. During the Crusader period, the Samaritans returned to Mount Gerizim to perform sacrifices, with evidence of their presence documented in a monumental inscription from that time. Later, in the 16th century, the tomb of Sheikh Ghanim was constructed at the northeastern corner of Justinian's fortifications.

== Archaeology ==
From 1983 to 2006, the remains of the sanctuary were uncovered over more than nineteen seasons of archaeological excavations led by Yitzhak Magen, Staff Officer of Archaeology for the Israeli Civil Administration of Judea and Samaria Area, at Jabal al-Tur, the highest peak of Mount Gerizim. The excavations occurred in the present-day West Bank, where archaeological work is often controversial due to the territory's disputed legal status. The excavators identified two main phases at the site: the sacred precinct from the Persian period – c. mid-fifth century BCE, and the sacred precinct from the Hellenistic period, constructed under the reign of Antiochus III. During the Hellenistic period, a city emerged around the sanctuary.

No physical remnants of the temple structure have been found, likely due to later constructions that took place on the site, such as the church of Mary Theotokos, built by Emperor Zeno (474–491 CE) after the Samaritan revolt of 484, and additional fortifications by Emperor Justinian I in the 6th century. The temple itself is believed to have been located in the sanctuary's western section, probably encircled by a surrounding wall.

=== First phase (c. 450–200 BCE) ===
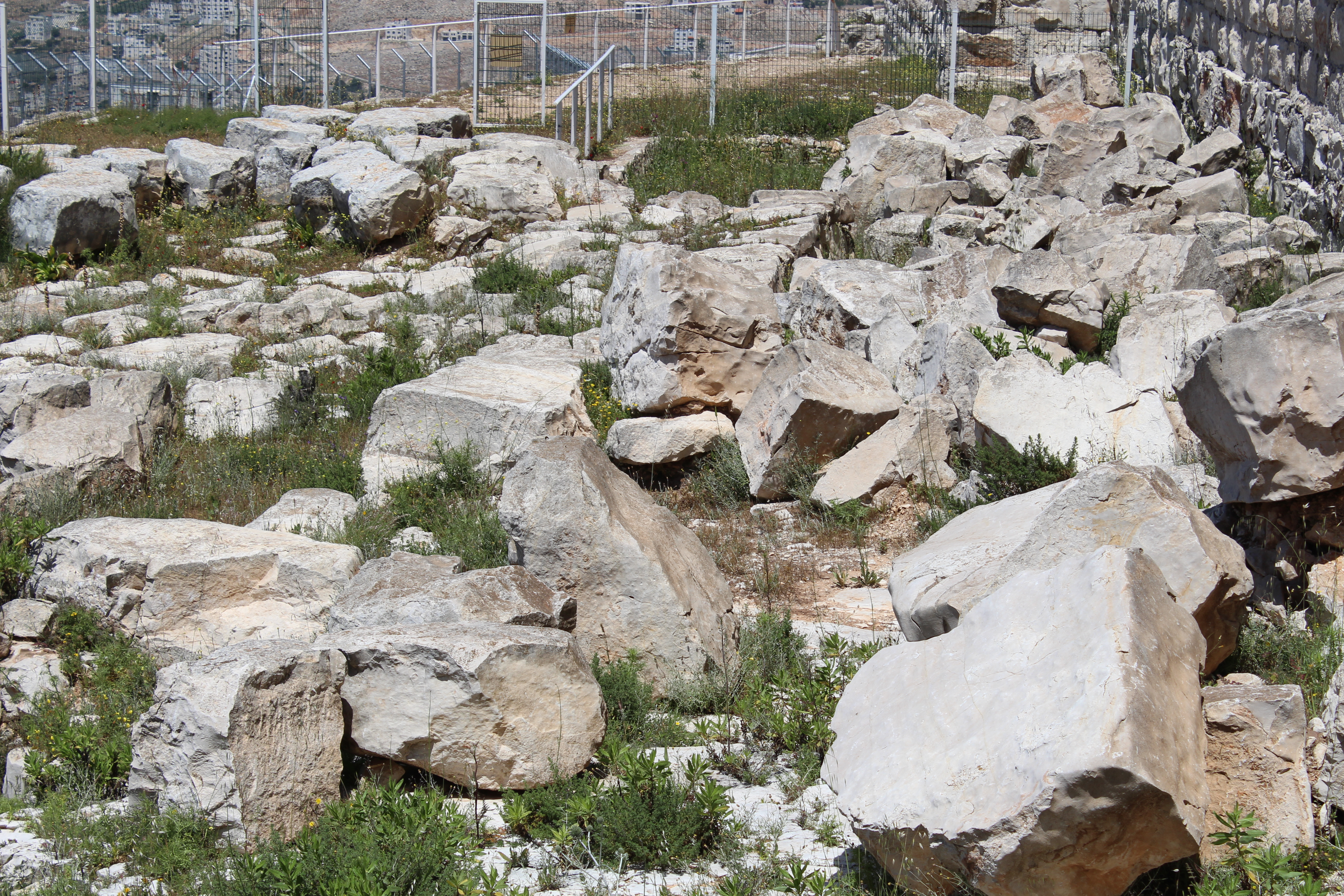
"The Twelve Stones," a contemporary Samaritan holy site, is thought by Magen to be situated at the former location of the temple's Holy of Holies

During the Persian period, the sacred precinct at the site was relatively small. This initial phase was constructed in the mid-5th century BCE and functioned for around 250 years. This dating is supported by the discovery of Persian-period coins, pottery, and radiocarbon analysis of charred animal bones from sacrificial offerings found at the site.

During the first phase, the precinct covered an area of about 96 by 98 meters. The well-preserved western wall, built from large fieldstones, extends 84 meters in length and stands 2 meters high. Excavations revealed unroofed courtyards at both corners of the western wall. Most of the eastern precinct wall has been damaged due to later constructions. The southern gate also experienced significant destruction from building activities during the Hellenistic periid, and alterations to the entrances of the sanctuary.

The Persian-period temple also featured proto-Ionic or Aeolic capitals, which archaeologists discovered among the debris. Scholars have offered various interpretations of these capitals. Stern and Magen proposed that they were likely brought from a nearby Iron Age temple, possibly at Shechem, as a symbol of the ongoing cultic practices from the Northern Kingdom of Israel. Archaeologist Oded Lipschits acknowledged their Iron Age origin but suggested they could have come from any significant building in Shechem, not necessarily from its temple. Jürgen Zangenberg believed that the presence of these capitals indicated an earlier Iron Age structure at Mount Gerizim, predating the Persian-period precinct. Eran Arie has used these capitals as evidence to support his theory that the Gerizim sanctuary was actually constructed in the late Iron Age.

The Persian-period enclosure likely featured three chamber gates situated to the north, east, and south, which, according to Magen, reflect the temple gates described in the Book of Ezekiel (Ezekiel 40:10–16). These gates may have served as a model for the Second Temple built by Jews returning from Babylon and later influenced the Samaritan temple. From the northern wall survives a six-chamber gate, a style attested at several Iron Age sites in Israel and Jordan, including Jezreel, Hazor, Gezer, Lachish, Ashdod, and Khirbet el-Medeiyneh (eth-Themed). No gates were found in the accessible western wall, possibly due to its proximity to the temple's Holy of Holies, which Magen believes corresponds to the current Samaritan sacred site known as "The Twelve Stones." In contemporary Samaritan tradition, these are the stones referenced in Deuteronomy 27, which they believe were once plastered and inscribed with the phrase "this Torah." East of the sacred precinct, excavations uncovered a public building measuring approximately 11 by 12 meters, identified as the "House of Ashes" adjacent to the altar where sacrifices were burned. This structure contained significant quantities of burnt bones and ashes, predominantly from goats, sheep, cattle, and doves, which have been dated to the 5th century BCE.

=== Second phase (c. 200–110 BCE) ===
In the early 2nd century BCE, a large precinct was built at the site, featuring a temple built of white ashlar at its center. The precinct, measuring 136 x 212 meters with 2.6-meter-thick walls, incorporated Greek architectural elements. It was made of smooth quarried stones, in contrast to the rough fieldstones used in the earlier phase. Key features included a grand entrance staircase leading to a paved plaza facing the temple, as well as a fortified gateway flanked by public buildings that catered to worshippers and visitors.

The renovated precinct featured substantial fortifications, including a 93-meter-long southern wall with a large central gate of four chambers and an entrance almost five meters wide. In the southeastern corner, a tall citadel stood with a central courtyard and thick walls. Pilgrims arriving from Shechem entered through the precinct eastern gate, ascending a grand staircase of 57 steps, which then culminated at a two-chamber gate with wooden doors affixed by brass hinges. This part also included large courtyards, used by pilgrims before entering the temple.

=== Hellenistic-period city ===
A fortified city from the Hellenistic period, measuring 500 by 800 meters (approximately 400 dunams or over 100 acres), was established on the southern ridge of Mount Gerizim, encompassing the sacred precinct from the Persian period. The city was accessible via two primary roads: one leading from Shechem and another extending from the route connecting to Jerusalem. During the reign of Antiochus III (223–187 BCE), the urban area spanned around 30 dunams (40.5 acres). The city is believed to have been founded primarily for ritual and religious purposes, functioning as a temple city populated by priests. Archaeological findings from the site include large residential buildings, service structures, courtyards, oil presses, storage jars, and a variety of lamps. Remnants of a city wall, located in the southern section of the site, were found alongside a fort that features four towers, which yielded coins dating from the fourth century through the era of John Hyrcanus. The city developed and expanded gradually, lacking any formal urban planning. Residential quarters were situated on the southern and western sides due to the moderate slope, while the northern and eastern sections experienced limited construction due to the challenging topography.

=== Inscriptions ===
Approximately 400 fragmentary inscriptions were uncovered at the Mount Gerizim site, though most were not found in situ. These inscriptions employ various scripts, including paleo-Hebrew, lapidary Aramaic, cursive Aramaic, and Samaritan. While the Samaritan inscriptions date to late antiquity and the Middle Ages, centuries after the temple's destruction, the majority of the inscriptions are from the Hellenistic period (3rd–2nd centuries BCE). Several inscriptions, such as numbers 382–85 and 387, were inscribed in paleo-Hebrew script, likely for public display. Common divine names in the inscriptions include "God" (אלהא) and "the Lord" (אדני). One paleo-Hebrew inscription even contains the Tetragrammaton, in what appears to be the phrase "[the house of] Yhwh." One inscription refers to a "house of sacrifice," echoing terminology used for the Jerusalem Temple in the Books of Chronicles (2 Chronicles 7:12). Some inscriptions mention a mīqdāš, meaning sanctuary, and 'atar, a cult place.

The majority of inscriptions found at the site are primarily dedicatory or votive. Many of the inscriptions incorporate formulaic phrases like “before the God in this place,” “before (the) God,” or “before the Lord,” indicating a temple context. One such inscription, written in Hebrew, reads: "that which Joseph offered for his wife and his sons before the Lord in the temple." Another inscription, written in Aramaic, states: "This is [the stone] that Delayah, son of Shimon, dedicated for himself and his children, [this] ston[e for] good remembrance before God in this place."

The inscriptions revealed 55 different names of men and women, with 35 being Hebrew, 13 Greek, and others identified as Arab, Palmyrene, Persian, or unknown. Analysis of the Hebrew names shows that many are known from the Hebrew Bible and the Jewish name onomasticon of the Second Temple period. Yahwistic names featuring the divine element 'Yah' or 'Yahu,' such as Hananiah (חנניה) and Shemaiah (שמעיה), are prevalent. It also reveals the presence of archaizing names that evoke figures from ancient Israel, like Jacob (יעקב), Ephraim (אפרים), Joseph (יוסף), and Miriam (מרים). Levitical names featured include Levi (לוי), Amram (עמרם), and Pinehas (פנחס). Additionally, there is a frequency of other common Hebrew names, such as Elnatan (אלנתן) and Hagai (חגי), which reflect typical naming conventions of the period. Inscriptions reference priestly titles in both singular (כהן, כהנא) and plural (כהנים, כהניא) forms, with one example mentioning "Pinhas the Priest" and "their brothers the priests."

=== Small findings ===
A total of 68 coins from the Persian period were discovered at the site, most of which originated from the precinct, with the earliest dating to 480 BCE. The Ptolemaic era yielded 417 coins, featuring issues from Ptolemy I through VI. Many of the coins primarily date to the Seleucid period, particularly from the reigns of Seleucus II, III, and Antiochus II–VIII. A total of 546 Hasmonean coins from the reigns of Hyrcanus, Aristobulus I, and Alexander Jannaeus were recovered, followed by a gap of several centuries before the late Roman period.

Over 400,000 burnt animal bones—mostly from sheep, goats, cattle, and pigeons—were uncovered in the sacred precinct. The bones were mainly found in layers of ash concentrated in several areas. Additionally, numerous weapons were discovered at the site, such as bronze arrowheads, lead sling projectiles, and an intact iron sword. Among the findings at the site is a small gold bell with a silver clapper. Magen proposed that it was part of the high priest's ephod, as mentioned in the Book of Exodus (28:33–35).

== Legacy ==
=== In Samaritan tradition ===
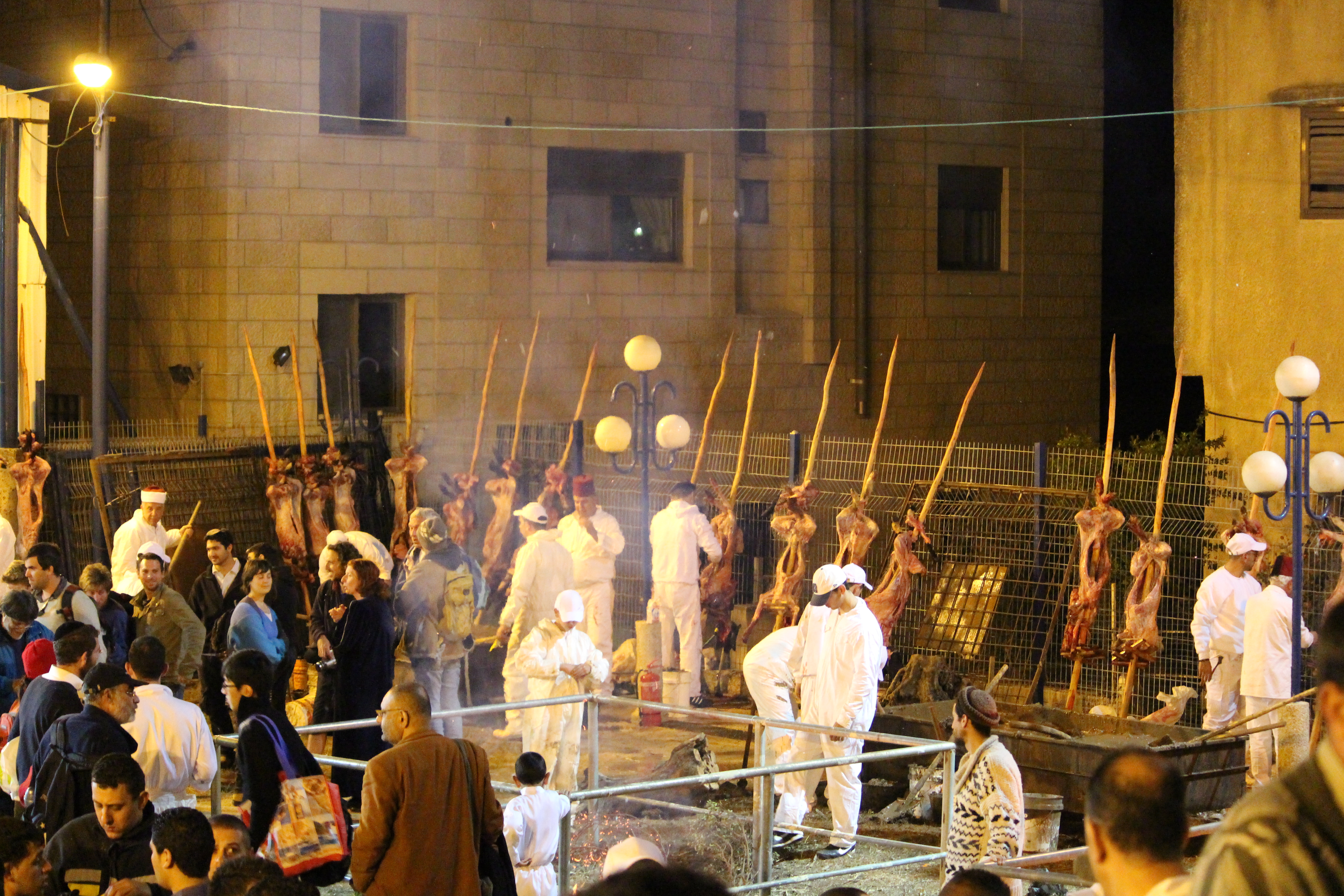
Samaritans performing the Passover sacrifice on Mount Gerizim, 2013

For Samaritans, the biblical Tabernacle is the sole legitimate sanctuary, and they assert that no lawful temple ever existed on Mount Gerizim or elsewhere. Unlike Judaism, which emphasizes the centrality of the Jerusalem Temple in historical, liturgical, and theological texts, Samaritan writings largely omit the Samaritan Temple. Instead, Samaritans view the archaeological findings on Mount Gerizim as remnants of administrative structures, or of a "sacrificial compound".

For Samaritans, Mount Gerizim itself is sacred. In the Samaritan Torah, the phrase "the place that the Lord will choose," found in the Masoretic and Septuagint versions of Deuteronomy, instead says "the place that God has chosen", referencing Mount Gerizim. Samaritans write Mount Gerizim as one word, Hargerizim, a conflation that originated during the Second Temple period. They anticipate that the eschatological figure of the Taheb, the returner or restorer, will restore not the Temple, but the Tabernacle, which is believed to be hidden on Mount Gerizim.

During the late Roman and early Byzantine periods, the memory of a temple may have endured among Samaritans, along with a hope for its eventual restoration. This idea is supported by floor mosaics found in Samaritan synagogues, such as Khirbet Samara and el-Khirbe, which some scholars believe depict temple façades. However, these mosaics could also reflect adaptations from Jewish synagogue art or illustrate the Torah shrine within the synagogue. Other interpretations propose that the images might represent the Tabernacle, consistent with later Samaritan artistic traditions that emphasize the Tabernacle.

Medieval Samaritan chronicler Abū l-Fatḥ, in his Kitāb al-Tarīkh, references an altar and temple allegedly constructed by the high priest 'Abdāl during the reign of King Sūrdī, possibly Darius I. He notes that the Jews later "demolished the altar and the temple which 'Abdāl the high priest had built." This account may indicate a fading memory of the temple. However, the oldest extant Samaritan chronicle, the Tūlīda, claims that 'Abdāl constructed only an altar. Contemporary Samaritans assert that 'Abdāl's temple lacked divine approval and thus holds no religious significance.

Reinhard Pummer, a scholar of ancient Samaritan history, suggests that the memory of the Gerizim temple may have been suppressed within Samaritan tradition due to the traumatic consequences of its destruction by their Jewish brethren, leading the community to emphasize the remembrance of the Tabernacle instead. This erasure of memory was likely further exacerbated by the destruction and neglect of synagogues, including artworks depicting the temple, during periods of Byzantine persecution.

=== In Jewish and Christian writings ===
An indirect reference to the Samaritan temple on Mount Gerizim appears in some Jewish sources. Megillat Ta'anit, a text from the first century CE, mentions that the 21st of Kislev is the "Day of Mount Gerizim." According to the Talmudic-era scholium, a commentary on the scroll, at this day, Alexander the Great gave Jews permission to plow and plant Mount Gerizim as punishment for the Samaritans' plot to destroy the Temple in Jerusalem. A similar account appears in Babylonian Talmud Yoma 69a, where the "Day of Mount Gerizim" is observed on the 21st of Tevet. According to historian Ori Amitay, this story likely refers to the destruction of the Gerizim precinct by Hyrcanus.

Procopius of Gaza (c. 475–538), likely drawing on written sources, wrote in his Commentary on Deuteronomy 11:29 that the Samaritans constructed a temple (ναόν) on Mount Gerizim where they engaged in prayer. In contrast, Procopius of Caesarea asserted in the 6th century that the Samaritans never had a temple at the summit of Mount Gerizim. This statement, according to Pummer, may stem from either his lack of knowledge about its historical existence, or a deliberate attempt to undermine the Samaritan tradition.

=== Tourism and conservation ===
The sanctuary ruins and surrounding archaeological area, located in the modern-day West Bank, are now part of a national park managed by the Israel Nature and Parks Authority, attracting both Israeli and Palestinian visitors. The site continues to hold special significance for Samaritans, who make three annual pilgrimages and have free access. Close to the archaeological site is the Samaritan village of Kiryat Luza, one of two locations where the community currently resides (alongside Holon), and where the traditional Passover sacrifice is observed.

In 2012, the site was nominated to the Tentative List of UNESCO World Heritage Sites of the State of Palestine under the name "Mount Gerizim and the Samaritans". Since 2021, conservation efforts by the Israel Nature and Parks Authority have aimed to enhance the site for tourism; a newly restored residential compound, believed to belong to a priestly family and notable for the discovery of a golden bell thought to adorn a priestly robe, opened to the public in 2022.

== See also ==
- Samaritanism
- Temple in Jerusalem
- Korban
- Mount Ebal site

== Bibliography ==
- Abu Alsaud, Loay (2018). "Byzantine Churches In Nablus (Neapolis), Palestine". Zephyrus. 82: 187–207. doi:10.14201/zephyrus201882187207.
- Amitay, Ory (2007). "Shim῾on ha-Şadiq in his Historical Contexts". Journal of Jewish Studies. 58 (2): 236–249. doi:10.18647/2733/JJS-2007.
- Angel, Joseph L. (2022). "'Kinsmen" or an "Alien Race?': Jews and Samaritans from the Hasmoneans to the Mishnah". In Fine, Steven (ed.). The Samaritans: A Biblical People. Brill. pp. 53–60. doi:10.1163/9789004466913. ISBN 978-900446690-6.
- Arie, Eran (2023). "When was the Sacred Precinct on Mount Gerizim Really Constructed? Why? and by Whom?". Semitica. 65: 141–164. doi:10.2143/SE.65.0.3293116. ISSN 2466-6815.
- Bourgel, Jonathan (2016). "The Destruction of the Samaritan Temple by John Hyrcanus: A Reconsideration". Journal of Biblical Literature. 135 (3): 505–523. doi:10.15699/jbl.1353.2016.3129.
- Bull, Robert J. (1975). "An Archaeological Context for Understanding John 4:20". The Biblical Archaeologist. 38 (2): 54–59. doi:10.2307/3209464.
- Dar, Shimon (2010). "Archaeological Aspects of Samaritan Research on Israel". Late Antique Archaeology. 6 (1): 189–198. doi:10.1163/22134522-90000134.
- Fine, Steven (2022). "'The Consolation of Souls, the Assurer of Hearts, and the Certainty of Truth': The Abisha Scroll". In Fine, Steven (ed.). The Samaritans: A Biblical People. Brill. pp. 15–30. doi:10.1163/9789004466913. ISBN 978-900446690-6.
- Kartveit, Magnar (2012). "The Second Temple and the Temple of the Samaritans". In Frey, Jörg; Schattner-Rieser, Ursula; Schmid, Konrad (eds.). The Samaritans and the Bible. De Gruyter. pp. 66–80. doi:10.1515/9783110294361.67. ISBN 978-311029409-5.
- Knoppers, Gary N. (2013). Jews and Samaritans: The Origins and History of Their Early Relations. Oxford University Press. doi:10.1093/acprof:oso/9780195329544.001.0001. ISBN 978-019532954-4.
- Kropp, Andreas J. M. (2021). "A Roman altar on Mount Gerizim: Rediscovering a civic icon on tetradrachms of Neapolis (Samaria)" (PDF). Journal of Roman Archaeology. 34: 220–236. doi:10.1017/S1047759421000106.
- Magen, Yitzhak (2007). "The Dating of the First Phase of the Samaritan Temple on Mount Gerizim in Light of the Archaeological Evidence". In Lipschits, Oded; Knoppers, Gary N.; Albertz, Rainer (eds.). Judah and the Judeans in the Fourth Century B.C.E. Penn State University Press. pp. 157–212. doi:10.1515/9781575065809. ISBN 978-157506580-9.
- Magen, Yitzhak (2008). Stern, Ephraim (ed.). The New Encyclopedia of Archaeological Excavations in the Holy Land. Israel Exploration Society; Biblical Archaeology Society. pp. 1742–1748.
- Naveh, Joseph; Magen, Yitzhak (1997). "Aramaic and Hebrew Inscriptions of the Second-Century BCE at Mount Gerizim". 'Atiqot. 32: 9–17. JSTOR 23458302.
- Pummer, Reinhard (2022). "The Samaritan Tabernacle: From Sinai to the Mountain of Blessings". In Fine, Steven (ed.). The Samaritans: A Biblical People. Brill. pp. 31–40. doi:10.1163/9789004466913. ISBN 978-900446690-6.
- Pummer, Reinhard (2024). "Samaritan Synagogue Mosaics and the Mt. Gerizim Temple". In Zsengellér, József (ed.). Samaritans Through the Ages: Studies on Samaritan History, Texts, Interpretation, Linguistics and Manuscripts. Studia Samaritana. Vol. 14. De Gruyter. pp. 23–42. doi:10.1515/9783111435732-003. ISBN 978-311143573-2.
- Romey, Kristin (19 April 2019). "The very ancient Passover of one of the smallest religions in the world". National Geographic.
- Schorch, Stefan (2022). "'Woe to Those Who Exchanged the Truth for a Lie, When They Choose for Themselves a Different Place': Samaritan Perspectives on the Samaritan–Jewish Split". In Fine, Steven (ed.). The Samaritans: A Biblical People. Brill. pp. 41–52. doi:10.1163/9789004466913. ISBN 978-900446690-6.
- Schwartz, Seth (2001). Imperialism and Jewish Society, 200 B.C.E. to 640 C.E. Jews, Christians, and Muslims from the Ancient to the Modern World. Princeton University Press. ISBN 978-019532954-4. JSTOR j.ctt7srjb.
- Sivan, Hagith (2008). Palestine in Late Antiquity. Oxford University Press. ISBN 978-019928417-7.
- Sudilovsky, Judith (14 May 2022). "The Samaritan connection to Mount Gerizim restoration, conservation". The Jerusalem Post.
