= Passover (Samaritan holiday) =

Samaritan religious holiday

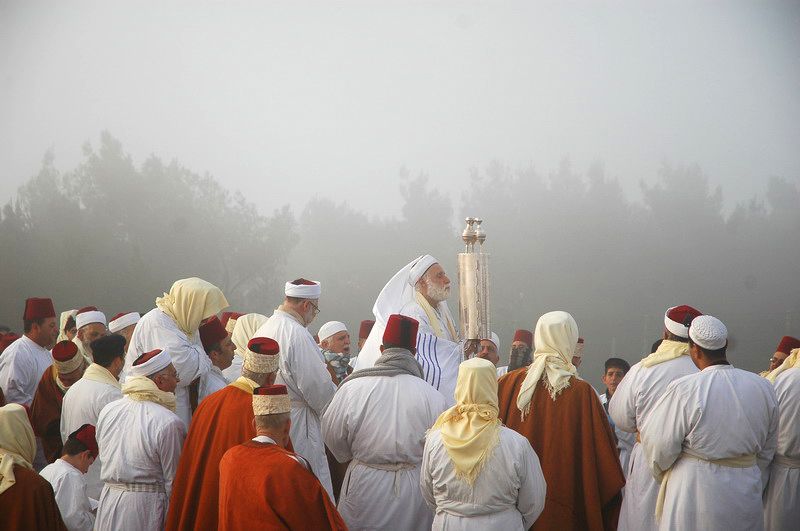
Samaritans' Passover pilgrimage on Mount Gerizim.

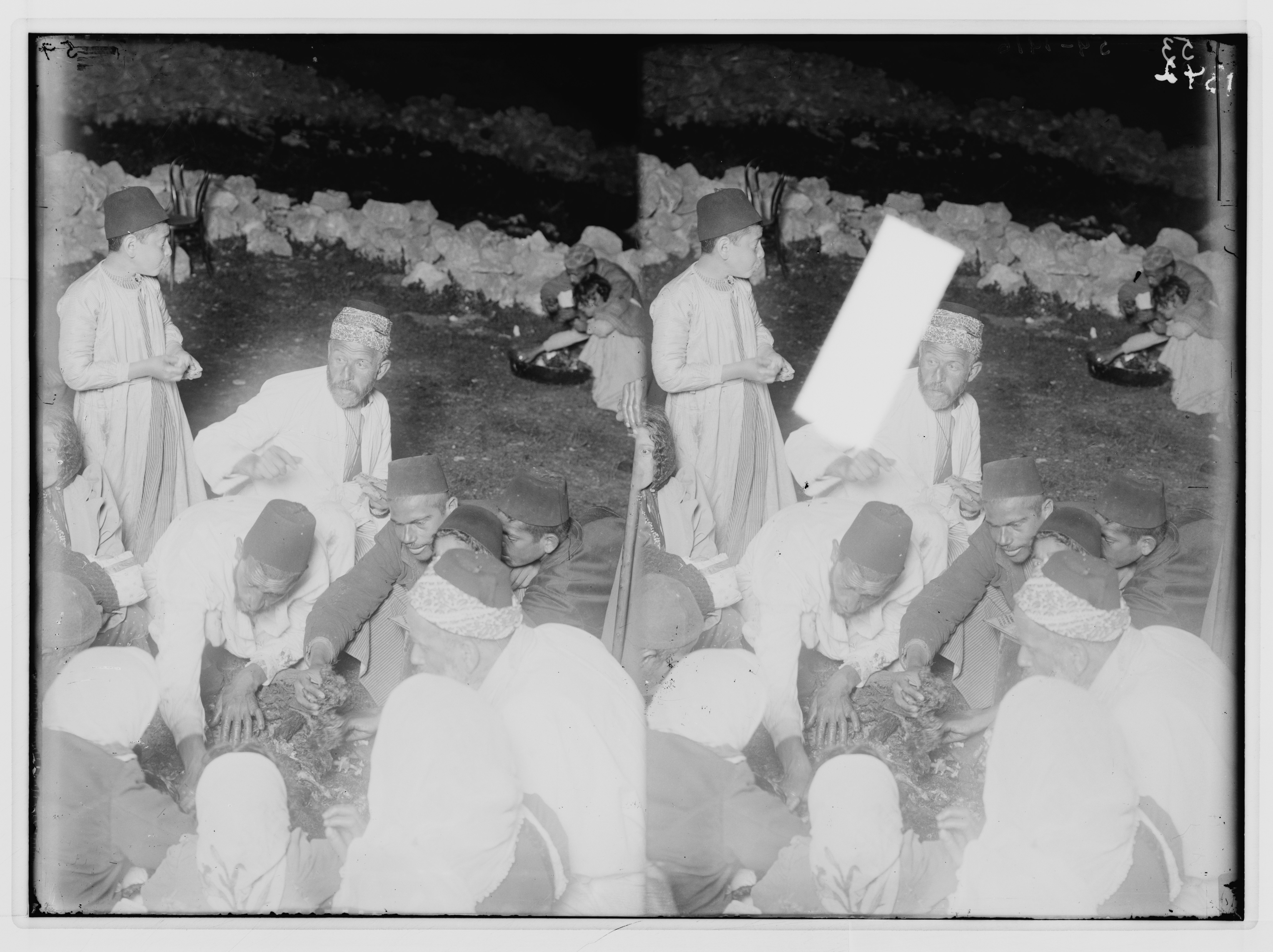
Samaritans eating the Passover sacrifice on Mount Gerizim. By The Matson Photo Service. 1900-1920

Passover, or Pesach in Hebrew, is a significant religious holiday in Samaritanism, commemorating the Israelites' exodus from Egypt and their liberation from slavery. The Samaritan Passover is celebrated every spring with a pilgrimage to and sheep sacrifice atop Mount Gerizim, the holiest site in the Samaritan religion. This ritual is a direct observance of the commandments found in Exodus 12, and it involves the slaughtering of sheep, dabbing the animals' blood on the participants' foreheads, and roasting the meat for the Passover meal.

== Observances ==
Samaritans observe Passover with a pilgrimage to Mount Gerizim, their holiest site, where a central sacrificial ceremony takes place. This practice directly follows the instructions outlined in Exodus 12, involving the slaughtering of sheep, marking participants' foreheads with the animal's blood, and roasting the meat for a communal feast. The sacrifice and blood-smearing symbolize the Israelites' marking of their doorposts in Exodus to protect against the Angel of Death.

Following the sacrifice, the roasted sheep meat is consumed with unleavened bread (matzah) and bitter herbs, mirroring the instructions in the Torah. Samaritans prepare and consume homemade matzah, a thin, pancake-like bread, differing from the flat matzah crackers commonly used by Jews. This celebratory meal takes place at midnight, accompanied by prayers and chants.

The animal sacrifice during Passover is a unique practice among contemporary Western religions, with the Samaritans being one of the few remaining groups to observe it. This practice distinguishes Samaritan Passover from its Jewish counterpart, where animal sacrifices are no longer performed.

== Calendar ==
Samaritan Passovers are each one day long, followed by the six-day Festival of Unleavened Bread – for a total of seven days.

Due to variations in their respective calendars, Samaritan Passover often falls approximately a month later than the Jewish Passover.

== See also ==
- Mount Gerizim: the holiest site for the Samaritans, where they perform their Passover sacrifices
- Passover: The Jewish observance of Passover, which includes the Passover Seder and other rituals
- Samaritan Pentateuch: The version of the Torah used by the Samaritans, which contains some differences from the Jewish Torah
