= Samaritanism =

Abrahamic monotheistic ethnic religion

- הַדָּת הַשּׁוֹמְרוֹנִית السَّامِرِيَّة
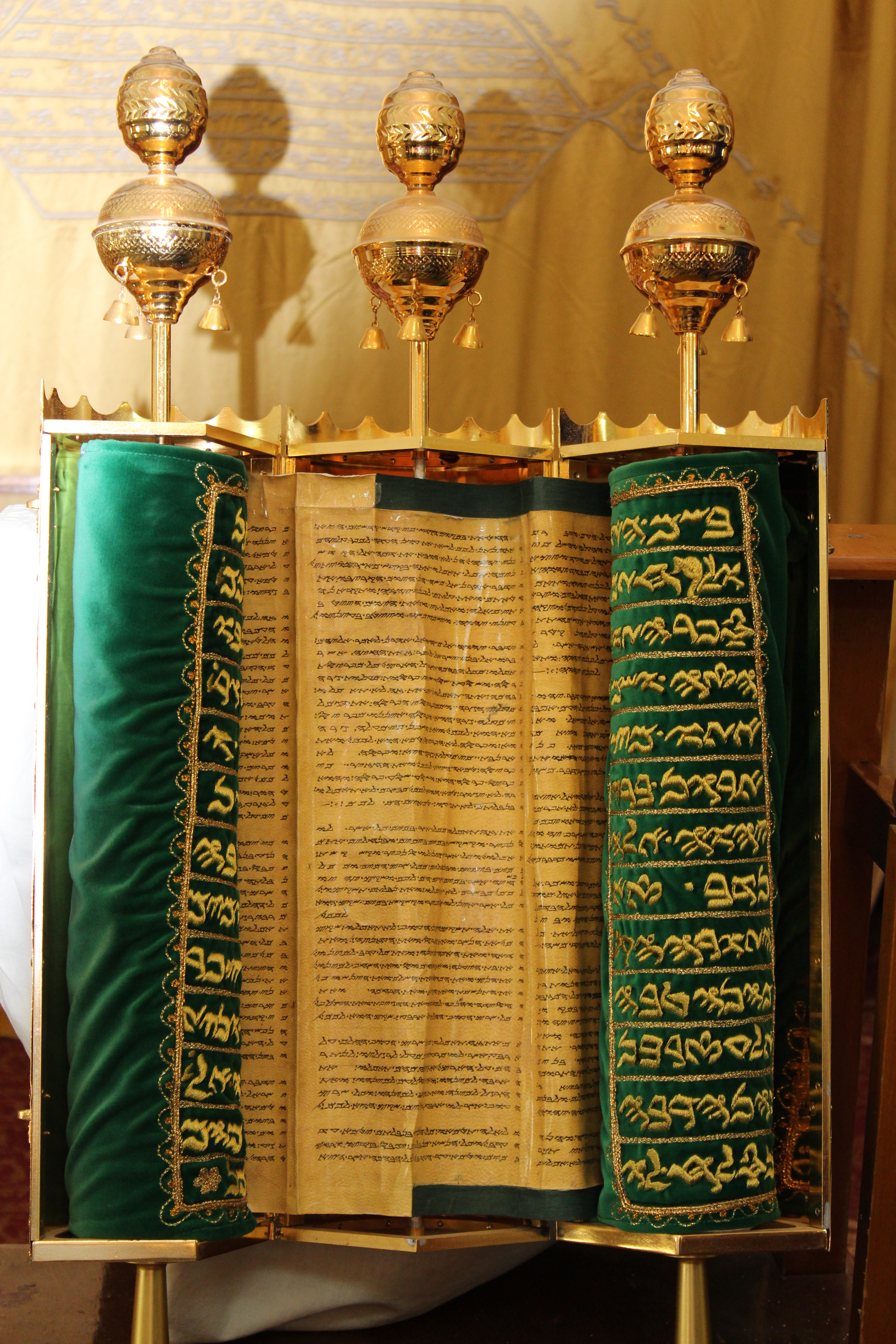
- Israelite Samaritan Torah scrolls in the Israelite Samaritan synagogue on Mount Gerizim
- Type: Ethnic religion
- Classification: Abrahamic, Israelite
- Scripture: Samaritan Pentateuch
- Theology: Monotheistic
- High Priest: Aabed-El ben Asher ben Matzliach
- Language: Samaritan Hebrew and Samaritan Aramaic
- Territory: Mount Gerizim and Land of Israel
- Founder: Abraham (ancestor); Moses (lawgiver)
- Origin: c. 6th – 3rd century BCE; History of ancient Israel and Judah
- Members: c. 900 (Samaritans)

Samaritanism (Hebrew: הַדָּת הַשּׁוֹמְרוֹנִית, ha-Dāt ha-Šomronīt); (Arabic: الدِّين السَّامِرِيَّة, ad-Dīn as-Sāmiriyya; is an Abrahamic monotheistic ethnic religion. It comprises the collective spiritual, cultural, and legal traditions of the Samaritan people, in Samaritan Hebrew: Shamerim (ࠔࠠࠌࠝࠓࠩࠉࠌ, Šåmerīm), who often prefer to be called Israelite Samaritans.

Samaritanism asserts itself as the truly preserved form of the monotheistic faith that the Israelites kept under Moses. Samaritan belief also holds that the Israelites' original holy site was Mount Gerizim, and that Jerusalem only attained importance under Israelite dissenters who had followed Eli to the city of Shiloh; the Israelites who remained at Mount Gerizim would become the Samaritans in the Kingdom of Israel, whereas the Israelites who departed would become the Jews in the Kingdom of Judah. Mount Gerizim is likewise revered by Samaritans as the location where the Binding of Isaac took place; this belief contrasts with the Jewish belief that the Binding occurred at Jerusalem's Temple Mount.

As of 2025, there are approximately 900 registered communal Samaritans. Samaritans believe that this small population is a prophecy fulfilled from a scriptural passage that says, "You will be left few in number." Samaritans hope for a future time when a prophet known as the "Taheb" (Restorer) will perform three signs, an era of divine favour will return, the hidden tabernacle of Moses will be miraculously revealed, and Mount Gerizim will be restored to its former glory.

== History ==
=== Traditional accounts ===
Samaritanism holds that the summit of Mount Gerizim is the true location of God's Holy Place. Samaritans trace their history as a separate entity to a period soon after the Israelites' entry into the Promised Land. Samaritan historiography traces the schism to High Priest Eli leaving Mount Gerizim, where stood the first Israelite altar in Canaan, and building a competing altar in nearby Shiloh. The dissenting group of Israelites who had followed Eli to Shiloh would be the ones who in later years would head south to settle Jerusalem (the Jews), whereas the Israelites who stayed on Mount Gerizim, in Samaria, would become known as the Samaritans.

Abu'l-Fath, who wrote a major work of Samaritan history in the 14th century, comments on Samaritan origins as follows:

A terrible civil war broke out between Eli son of Yafni, of the line of Ithamar, and the sons of Pincus (Phinehas), because Eli son of Yafni resolved to usurp the High Priesthood from the descendants of Pincus. He used to offer sacrifices on an altar of stones. He was 50 years old, endowed with wealth and in charge of the treasury of the Children of Israel. ...

He offered a sacrifice on the altar, but without salt, as if he were inattentive. When the Great High Priest Ozzi learned of this, and found the sacrifice was not accepted, he thoroughly disowned him; and it is (even) said that he rebuked him.

Thereupon he and the group that sympathized with him, rose in revolt and at once he and his followers and his beasts set off for Shiloh. Thus Israel split in factions. He sent to their leaders saying to them, Anyone who would like to see wonderful things, let him come to me. Then he assembled a large group around him in Shiloh, and built a Temple for himself there; he constructed a place like the Temple [on Mount Gerizim]. He built an altar, omitting no detail—it all corresponded to the original, piece by piece.

At this time the Children of Israel split into three factions. A loyal faction on Mount Gerizim; a heretical faction that followed false gods; and the faction that followed Eli son of Yafni in Shiloh.

Further, the Samaritan New Chronicle or Adler, named after its editor Elkan Nathan Adler (1861–1946), which is believed to have been composed in the 18th century using earlier chronicles as sources, states:

And the Children of Israel in his days divided into three groups. One did according to the abominations of the Gentiles and served other gods; another followed Eli the son of Yafni, although many of them turned away from him after he had revealed his intentions; and a third remained with the High Priest Uzzi ben Bukki, the chosen place.

=== Scholarly perspective ===
Modern genetic studies (2004) suggest that Samaritans' lineages trace back to a common ancestor with Jews in the paternally-inherited Jewish high priesthood (Cohanim) temporally proximate to the period of the Assyrian conquest of the kingdom of Israel, and are probably descendants of the historical Israelite population. The religion of the proto-Samaritans at this time was probably no different than that of their southern counterparts in Judea. This likely remained the case for several centuries after the destruction of the Kingdom of Israel, as Judean cultic reforms instituted by the kings Hezekiah and Josiah experience little opposition extending to the Samaritan people in the north, according to the biblical text.

Though Samaritans certainly were culturally unique, they were closely intertwined with the Jews to the south. As such, Samaritanism likely did not emerge as a distinct tradition until the Hasmonean and Roman era, by which point Yahwism had coalesced into Second Temple Judaism. The temple on Mount Gerizim, the central place of worship in Samaritanism, was built in the 5th century BCE, as one of many Yahwistic temples in Samaria. However, the temple precinct experienced a centuries-long period of large-scale construction beginning around the 4th century BCE, which indicates that its status as the pre-eminent place of worship among Samaritans had only just been established. Likewise, theological debates between Jews and Samaritans are attested as early as the 2nd century BCE, indicating that the Samaritan Pentateuch had already taken shape, in some form.

The Hasmonean ruler and high priest John Hyrcanus destroyed the Mount Gerizim temple and brought Samaria under his control around 120 BCE, which led to a longlasting sense of mutual hostility between the Jews and Samaritans. From this point, the Samaritans likely sought to consciously distance themselves from their Judean brethren, and both peoples came to see the Samaritan faith as a religion distinct from Judaism.

The relationship between Jews and Samaritans only further deteriorated with time. By the time of Jesus, Samaritans and Jews deeply disparaged one another, as evinced by Jesus's Parable of the Good Samaritan.

== Beliefs ==
The principal beliefs of Samaritanism are as follows:

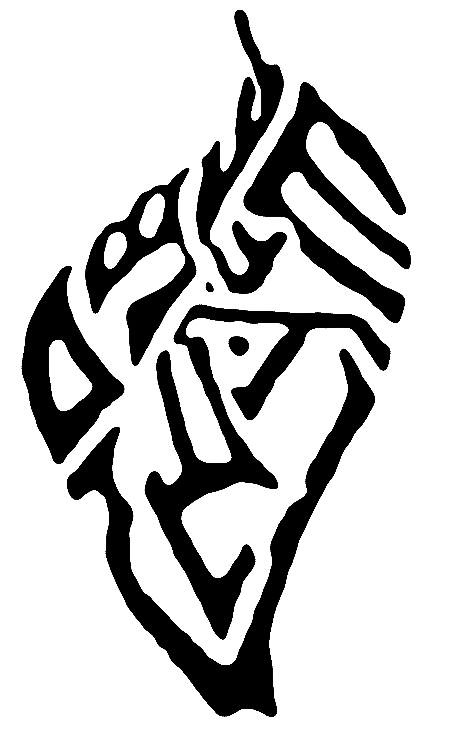
Shema Yisrael (ࠔࠌࠏ ࠉࠔࠓࠀࠋ) written in Samaritan Hebrew calligraphy is the official symbol of the Samaritans.

- There is one God called YHWH, the same God recognized by the Jewish prophets.
- The Torah is the only true holy book and was given by God to Moses. They have a variation of the Book of Joshua, but don't regard it as scripture.
- Moses is considered to be the final Prophet, and the only authority after him is the successive Samaritan Priesthood, from the line of Aaron.
- Shechem, not Jerusalem, is the one true sanctuary chosen by God. The Samaritans do not recognize the sanctity of Jerusalem and do not recognize the Temple Mount, claiming instead that Mount Gerizim was the place where the binding of Isaac took place.
- There will be an apocalypse, called "the day of vengeance", which will be the end of days.
- On the end of days, a figure called the Taheb (essentially the Samaritan Messiah) from the Tribe of Joseph will emerge. He will be a prophet like Moses for 40 years, bringing about the return of the Kingdom of Israel, following which the dead will be resurrected, and he will discover the Tabernacle, which he will bring to Mount Gerizim, after which he will be buried next to Joseph.

=== Torah and the holy place ===
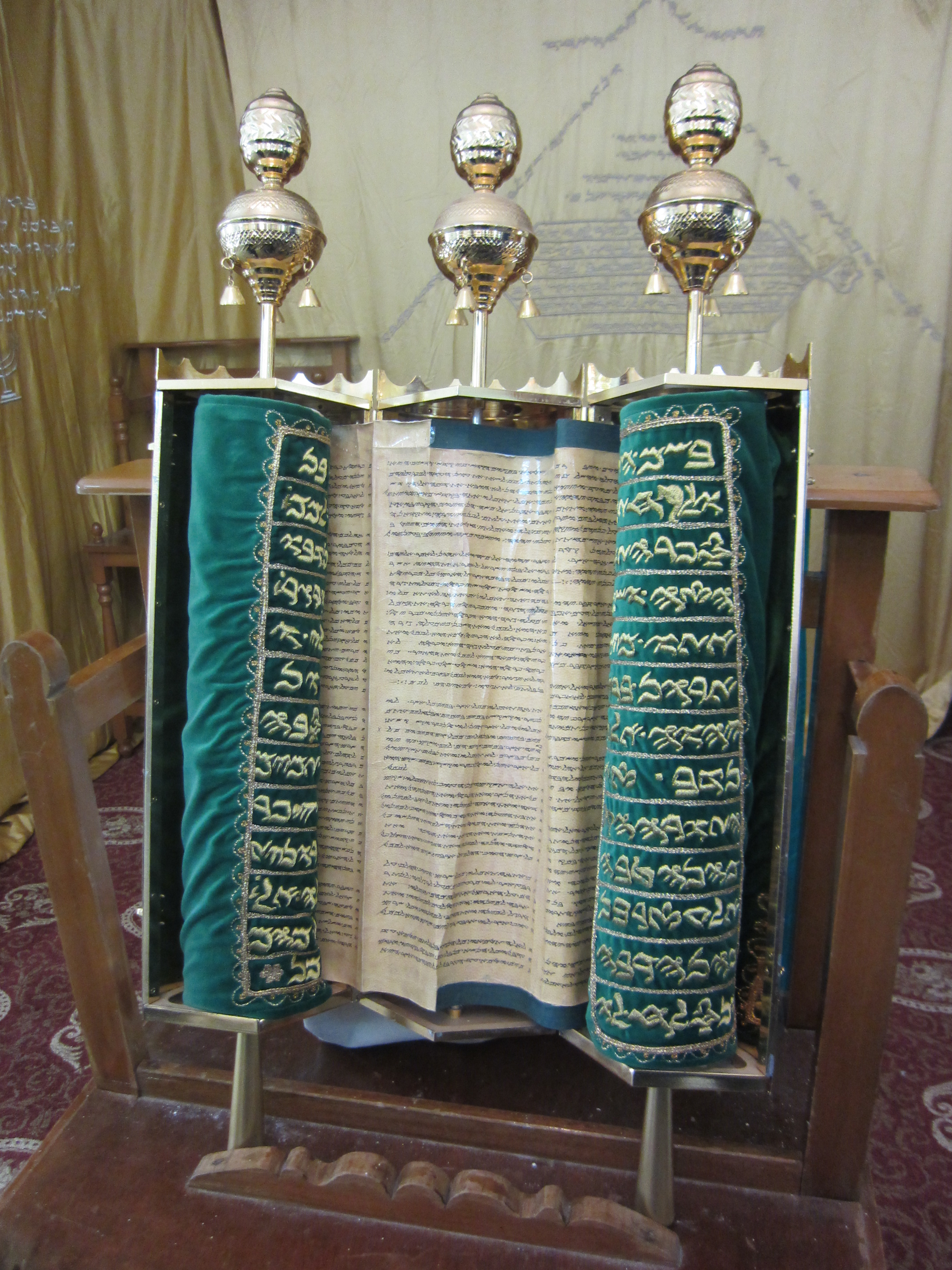
Torah displayed in the synagogue of Mount Gerizim

As noted above, what most distinguishes the Samaritans from the Jews is that they do not recognize the sanctity that the latter attribute to the Temple of Jerusalem, since for them Gerizim is the true sacred mountain where God resides, and they accept only the authority of the Pentateuch in its Samaritan version; therefore they reject that of all the other books of the Tanakh; (Note: The books of Joshua and Judges, from the pre-monarchic Israelite period, are considered apocryphal.) which are recognized by the Jews, as well as all later Jewish literature (such as the classical rabbinic works of the Talmud, the Midrash and the Tosefta).

The differences between the Samaritan Torah and the Masoretic Text that are of greater importance are those that concern the status of Mount Gerizim as the principal place of worship instead of Jerusalem, due to their doctrinal character. Above all, in the Samaritan version of the "Ten Commandments", God gives as the tenth commandment that an altar be built for Him, expressly on Mount Gerizim, so that He may be worshipped there, once the Israelites have settled in Canaan. This does not break the correspondence of the other commandments with the Jewish ones; since, for the Samaritans, what some religions present as the first commandment: "I am the Eternal Yahweh, your God, who brought you out of the land of Egypt, out of the house of bondage."; is merely a presentation; and thus the following commandment: "You shall have no other gods before me. [...]"; is the first commandment of the Samaritan Torah; which leaves room for the one concerning Gerizim, so that in both versions the same number of commandments is considered. In fact, from the Samaritan perspective, the Jewish rabbis made the presentation into a commandment to maintain the name "Ten Commandments" (which is mentioned in Exodus 34:28), after having "corrected" their version by removing the tenth from the two passages of 'the Ten Commandments' that exist in the Tanakh (Exodus 20:1–17 and Deuteronomy 5:5–21).

And not only that, in accordance with the tenth commandment of the Samaritan Torah in which God chooses Gerizim as a sanctuary, in other passages of the Samaritan Pentateuch it is also mentioned without ambiguity that Mount Gerizim is "the place that God has chosen" for His Temple in contrast to the Jewish Torah, which refers to "the place that God will choose" (Deuteronomy 12:1–28 and 16:2).

== Clergy and worship ==
The Samaritans preserve the priestly institution (Note: Formerly, in Judaism there was also a hereditary priesthood, but it ceased to function after the destruction of the Second Temple of Jerusalem, and since then the rabbis have been the only ones responsible for religious instruction in the synagogues.) and the highest position within Samaritanism is held by the High priest, who is chosen from within the priestly caste of the community, which is supposed to descend directly from the house of Aaron, brother of Moses. His residence is on Mount Gerizim and, since 1624, the member of greatest age is chosen for the position.

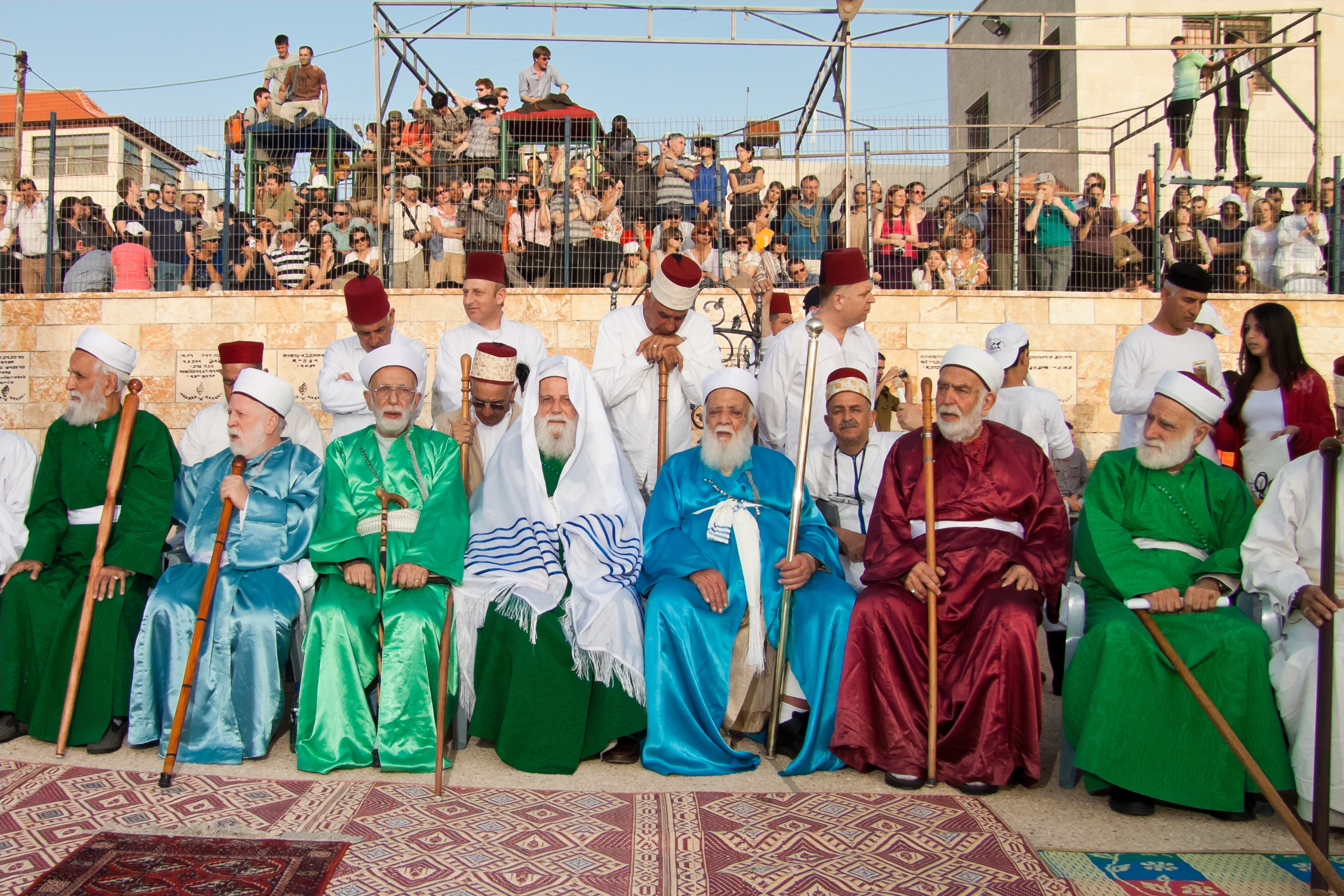
The High Priest accompanied by other Samaritan priests in the celebration of Passover

After the High Priest come the other priests. The elders usually wear a red turban and cassock, although on Saturdays and other sacred days they change this clothing for a more striking one. The Samaritan community of Holon (Israel) has its own local priest.

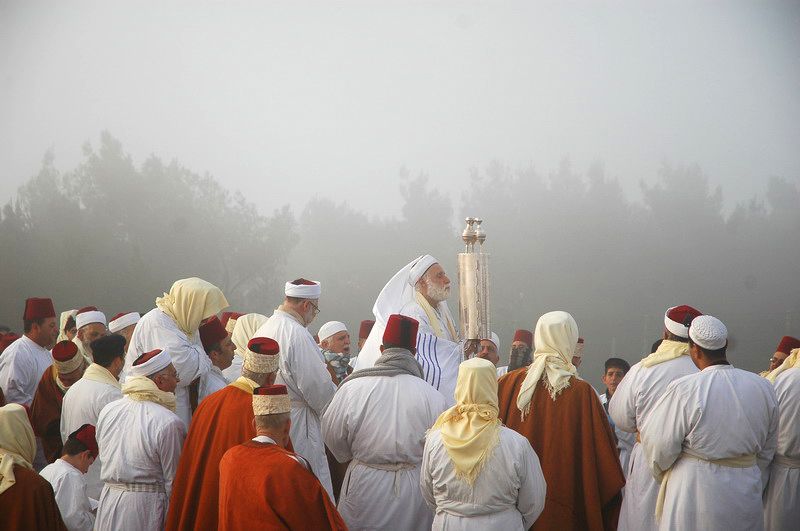
High Priest leading a procession at Passover

In the Samaritan religion it is prescribed that members of the priestly family do not work, but only deal with religious matters (Leviticus 21:12), and that the rest of the community contribute to their maintenance through tithes and offerings (Leviticus 2:1–10, 6:14–18, 27:30–32 and Numbers 18:24–28). However, in recent times, the number of members of the priestly family has become considerable compared with the rest of the Samaritan community (28% in 2003), so that this traditional arrangement has become impractical and members of the priestly family have had to seek work like any other Samaritan.

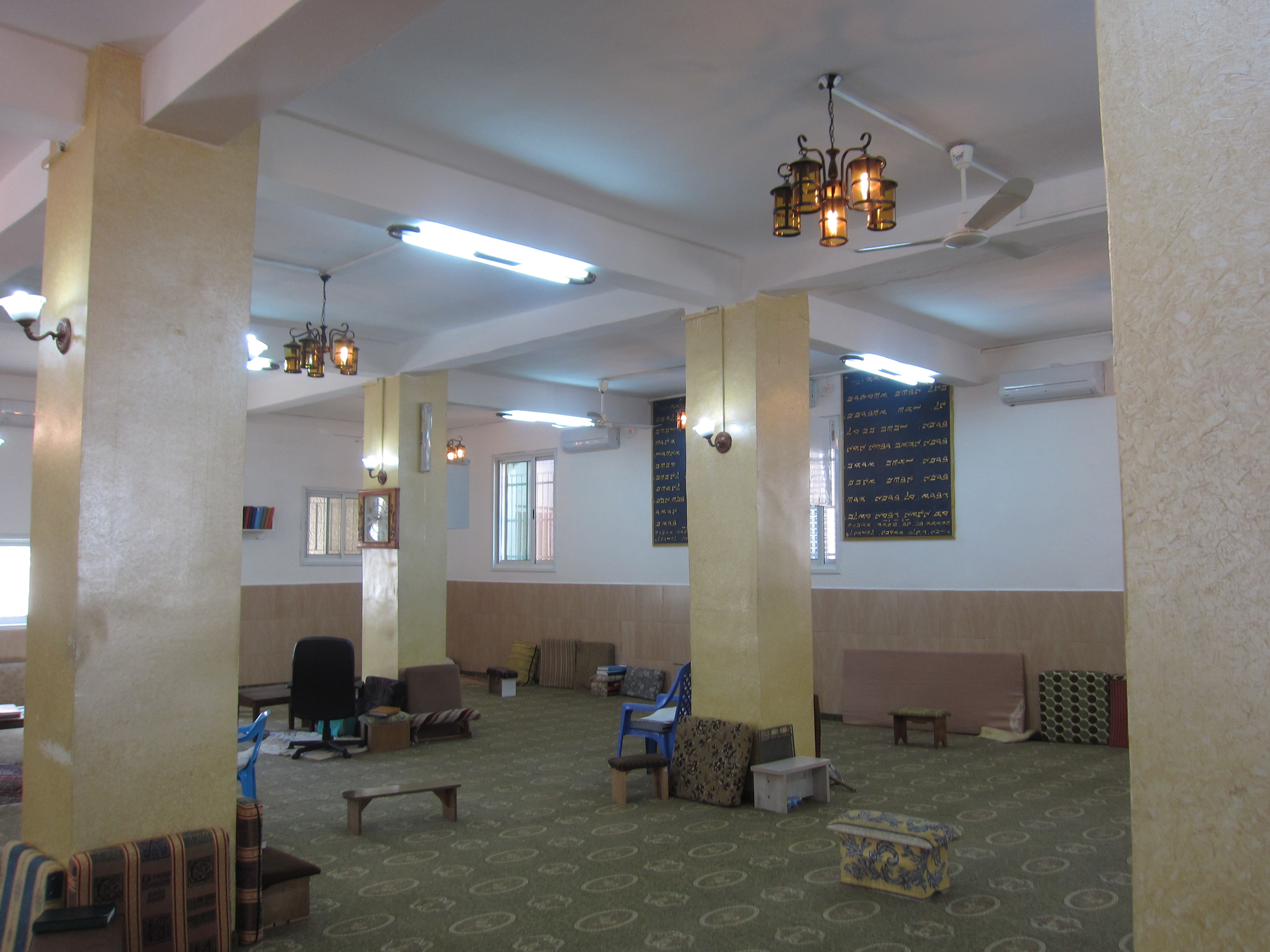
Interior of the Samaritan synagogue of Mount Gerizim

However, it should be added that in Samaritan society, from the lineage of the priestly family come not only the priests, but also the leaders of prayers (imams) and the rabbis, who teach the ancient Samaritan language.

Samaritan synagogues are oriented toward Gerizim and are usually located on the outskirts of the settlements (Exodus 33:7); the symbols with which they are decorated are all exclusively mosaics: menorahs, shofars, trumpets, heads of doves, sheep and goats.

== Festivals and observances ==
The Samaritans have conserved the institution of a high priesthood and the practice of slaughtering and eating lambs on Passover eve. They celebrate Pesach, Shavuot, and Sukkot, but use a different mode from that employed in Judaism to determine the dates annually. Yom Teru'ah (the Biblical name for "Rosh Hashanah"), at the beginning of Tishrei, is not considered a New Year as it is in Rabbinic Judaism.

The sabbath is observed weekly by the Samaritan community every week from Friday to Saturday beginning and ending at sundown. For 24 hours, the families gather together to celebrate the rest day: all electricity with the exception of minimal lighting (kept on the entire day) in the house is disconnected, no work is done, and neither cooking nor driving is allowed. The time is devoted to worship which consists of seven prayer services (divided into two for sabbath eve, two in the morning, two in afternoon and one at eve of conclusion), reading the weekly Torah portion (according to the Samaritan yearly Torah cycle), spending quality time with family, taking meals, rest and sleep, and visiting other members of the community.

Passover is particularly important in the Samaritan community, climaxing with the sacrifice of up to 40 sheep. The Counting of the Omer remains largely unchanged; however, the week before Shavuot is a unique festival celebrating the continued commitment Samaritanism has maintained since the time of Moses. Shavuot is characterized by nearly day-long services of continuous prayer, especially over the stones on Gerizim traditionally attributed to Joshua.

During Sukkot, the sukkah is built inside houses, as opposed to outdoor settings that are traditional among Jews. Samaritan historian Benyamim Tsedaka traces the indoor-sukkah tradition to persecution of Samaritans during the Byzantine Empire. The roof of the Samaritan sukkah is decorated with citrus fruits and the branches of palm, myrtle, and willow trees, according to the Samaritan interpretation of the four species designated in the Torah for the holiday.

A peculiarity in Samaritanism, is that during Holidays, they recite the liturgy with an audible, fully preserved Samaritan Hebrew pronunciation of the Tetragrammaton, being something akin to *Yahúwēh.

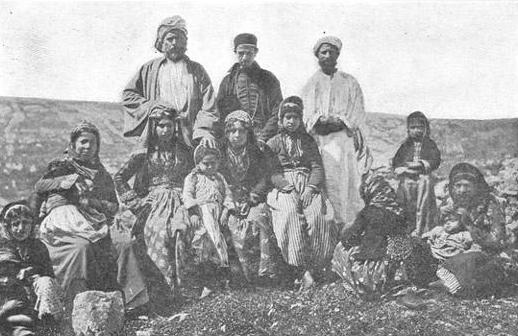
Samaritans, from a photo c. 1900 by the Palestine Exploration Fund

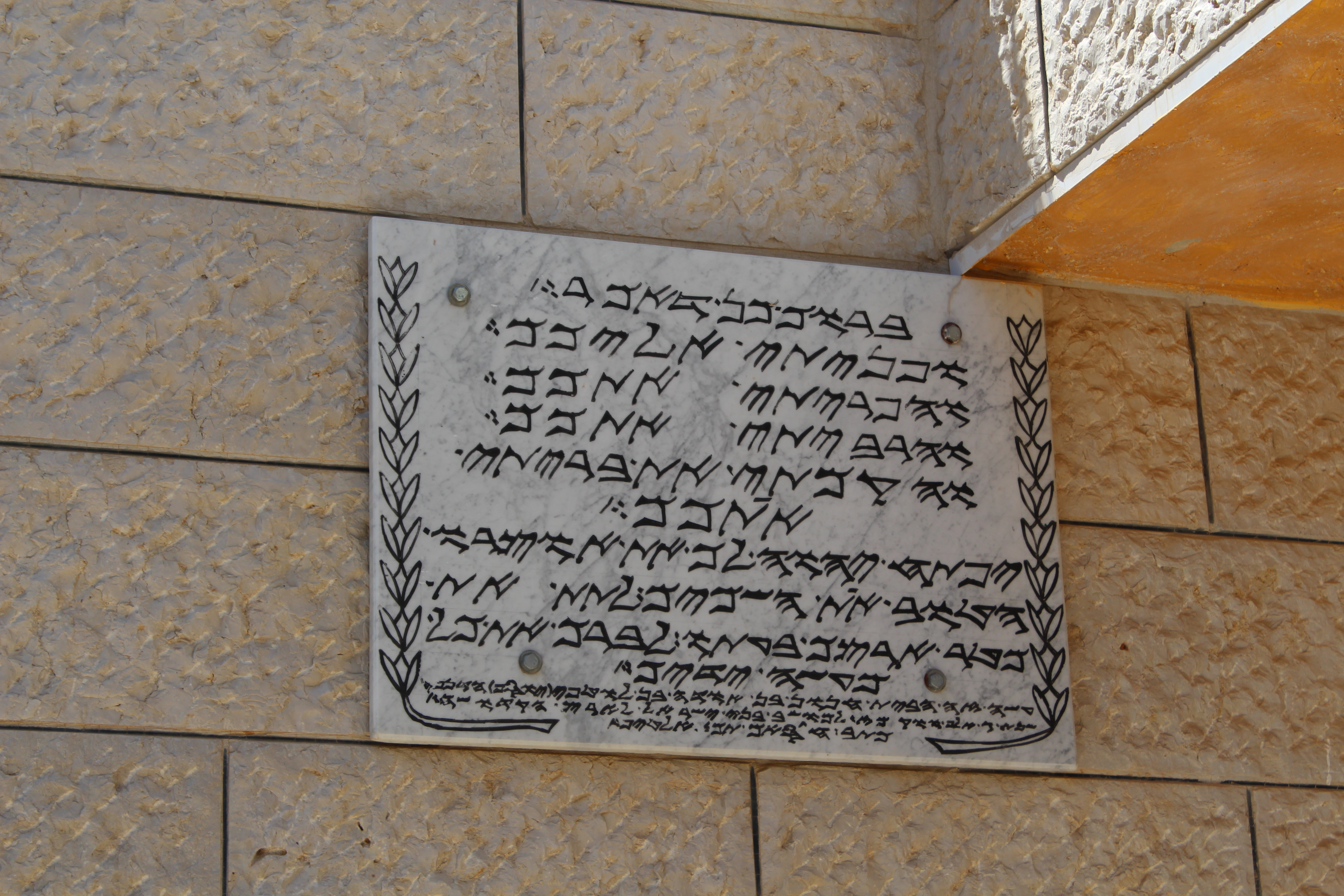
Samaritan mezuzah in the city of Nablus, 2013

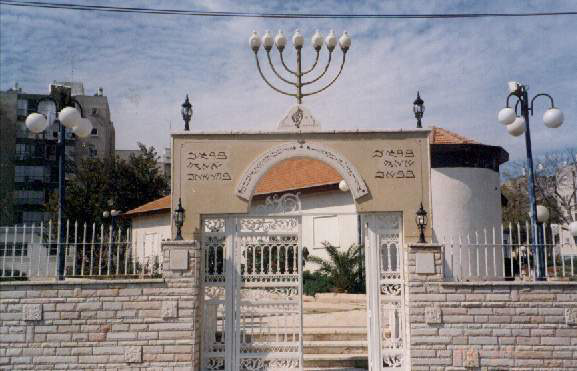
A modern Samaritan synagogue in the Samaritan neighborhood of Neve Pinchas in the city of Holon, Israel

== Religious texts ==
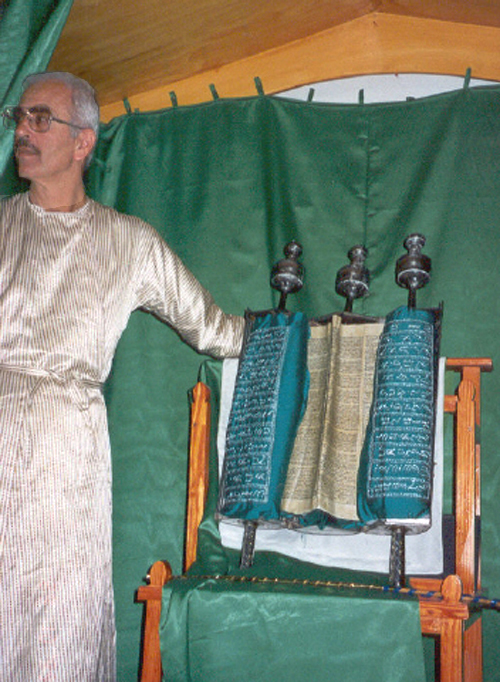
Samaritan and Samaritan Torah

Samaritan law differs from Halakha (Rabbinic Jewish law) and other Jewish movements. The Samaritans have several groups of religious texts, which correspond to Jewish Halakha. A few examples of such texts are:

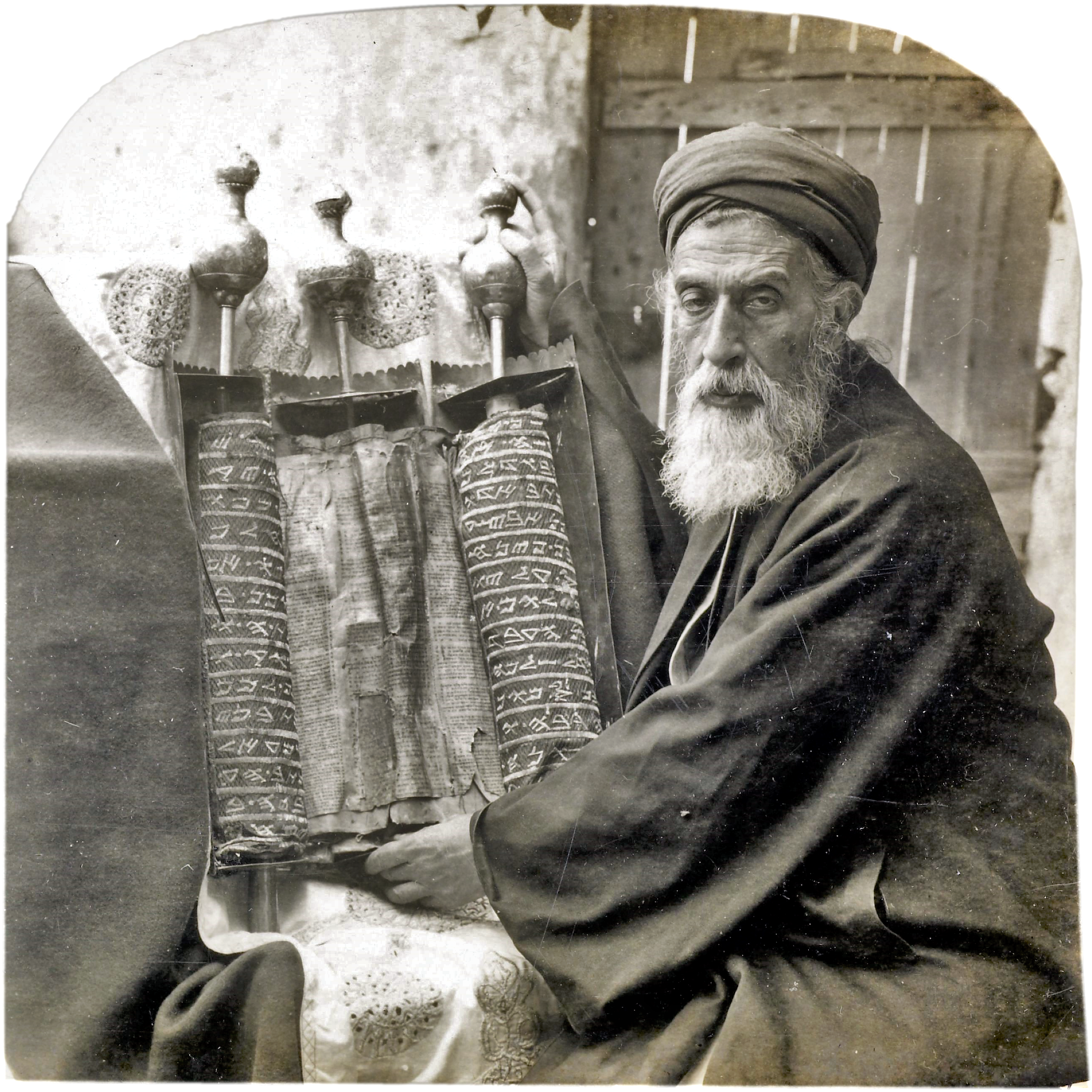
Samaritan High Priest Yaakov ben Aharon and the Abisha Scroll, 1905

- Samaritan Pentateuch: There are some 6,000 differences between the Samaritan Pentateuch and the Masoretic Jewish Pentateuch text; and, according to one estimate, 1,900 points of agreement between it and the Greek LXX version. Several passages in the New Testament would also appear to echo a Torah textual tradition not dissimilar to that conserved in the Samaritan text. There are several theories regarding the similarities. The variations, some corroborated by readings in the Old Latin, Syriac and Ethiopian translations, attest to the antiquity of the Samaritan text, although the exact date of composition is still largely unclear. Granted special attention is the so-called "Abisha Scroll", a manuscript of the Pentateuch tradition attributed to Abishua, grandson of Aaron, traditionally compiled during the Bronze Age.
- Historical writings
  - Samaritan Chronicle, The Tolidah (Creation to the time of Abishah)
  - Samaritan Chronicle, The Chronicle of Joshua (Israel during the time of divine favor) (4th century, in Arabic and Aramaic)
  - Samaritan Chronicle, Adler (Israel from the time of divine disfavor until the exile)
  - Samaritan Chronicle, The Kitab al-Tarikh of Abu 'l-Fath (Historical chronology from Adam to Mohammad)
- Halakhic texts
  - Samaritan Halakhic Text, The Hillukh (Code of Halakha, marriage, circumcision, etc.)
  - Samaritan Halakhic Text, the Kitab at-Tabbah (Halakha and interpretation of some verses and chapters from the Torah, written by Abu Al Hassan 12th century CE)
  - Samaritan Halakhic Text, the Kitab al-Kafi (Book of Halakha, written by Yosef Al Ascar 14th century CE)
- Haggadic Midrash texts
  - Al-Asatir—legendary Aramaic texts from the 11th and 12th centuries, containing:
    - Haggadic Midrash, Abu'l Hasan al-Suri
    - Haggadic Midrash, Memar Markah—3rd or 4th century theological treatises attributed to Hakkam Markha
    - Haggadic Midrash, Pinkhas on the Taheb
    - Haggadic Midrash, Molad Maseh (On the birth of Moses)
- Liturgical texts
  - Defter, prayer book of psalms and hymns.
  - Samaritan Haggadah

== Relationship with other religions ==
=== Relationship with Judaism ===
Samaritans are not usually recognized as Jews by Orthodox Jews, especially by Jewish rabbis, despite the clear kinship between the two groups. This rejection is based on the accounts in the Books of Kings, according to which the Samaritans are descendants of the inhabitants of the Kingdom of Israel deported by Assyria around 720 BC who would have intermingled with the local pagan population and therefore would not be pure descendants of the Israelites.

In the Babylonian Talmud it is indicated that, to convert to Judaism, the first condition a Samaritan must fulfill is to renounce any belief in the sanctity of Mount Gerizim. Nevertheless, it also states that Samaritans should be treated as Jews in matters where their practices are the same as those of Jews and as gentiles when they differ.

Alternatively, since the 19th century, many Jews have considered the Samaritans to be a Jewish sect, even to the point of granting them the status of "Samaritan Jews".

=== Relationship with Christianity ===
In the Gospels one can find the Parable of the Good Samaritan, as well as some other allusions indicating that Jews and Samaritans did not associate with one another. However, such stories actually refer to the relationship between Samaritanism and Judaism in the time of Jesus, and not to the true relationship between Samaritanism and Christianity. These relations do not appear to have been entirely tolerant during the first centuries of the Christian era, since the Byzantine Empire persecuted the Samaritans, practically annihilating them after the Samaritan revolts of the 5th century and the 6th century.

== See also ==
- Amram ibn Salameh
