= Mount Gerizim =

Mountain in the West Bank

Gerizim
- ࠒࠓࠉࠕ ࠋࠅࠆࠄ; קרית לוזה; قرية لوزة
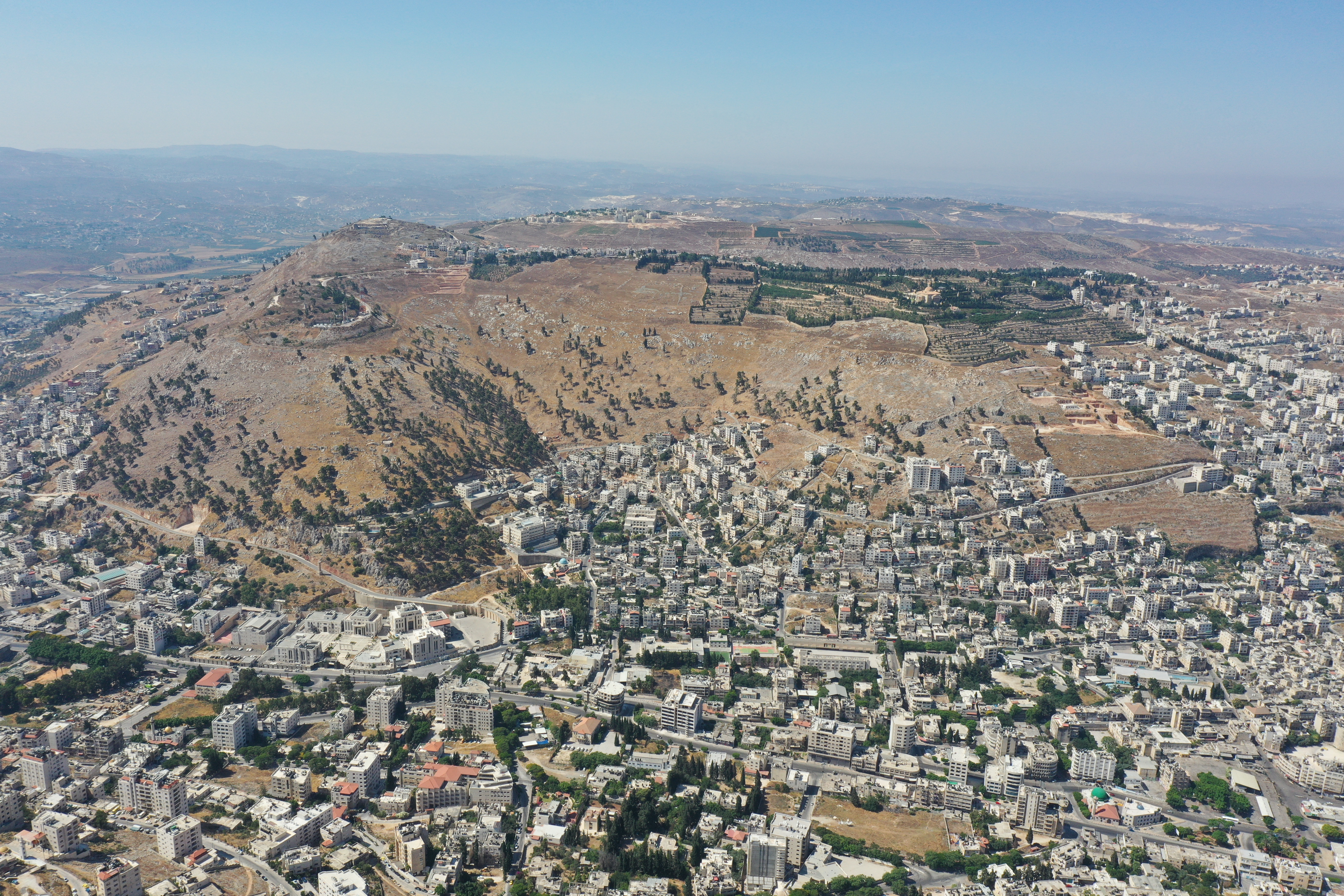
- Mount Gerizim ridge as seen from Mount Ebal

Highest point
- Coordinates: 32°12′3.1″N 35°16′23.73″E

Geography
- Location within the West Bank
- Parent range: Samarian Mountains

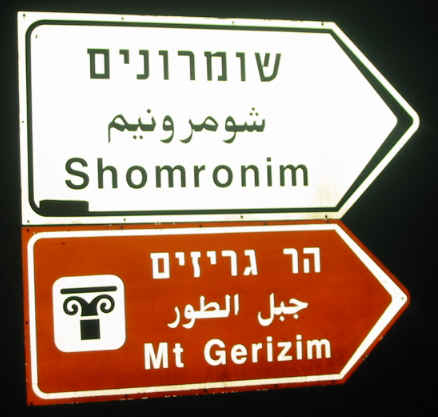
Trilingual road signs directing toward Mount Gerizim and Kiryat Luza (Shomronim – Samaritans in Hebrew)

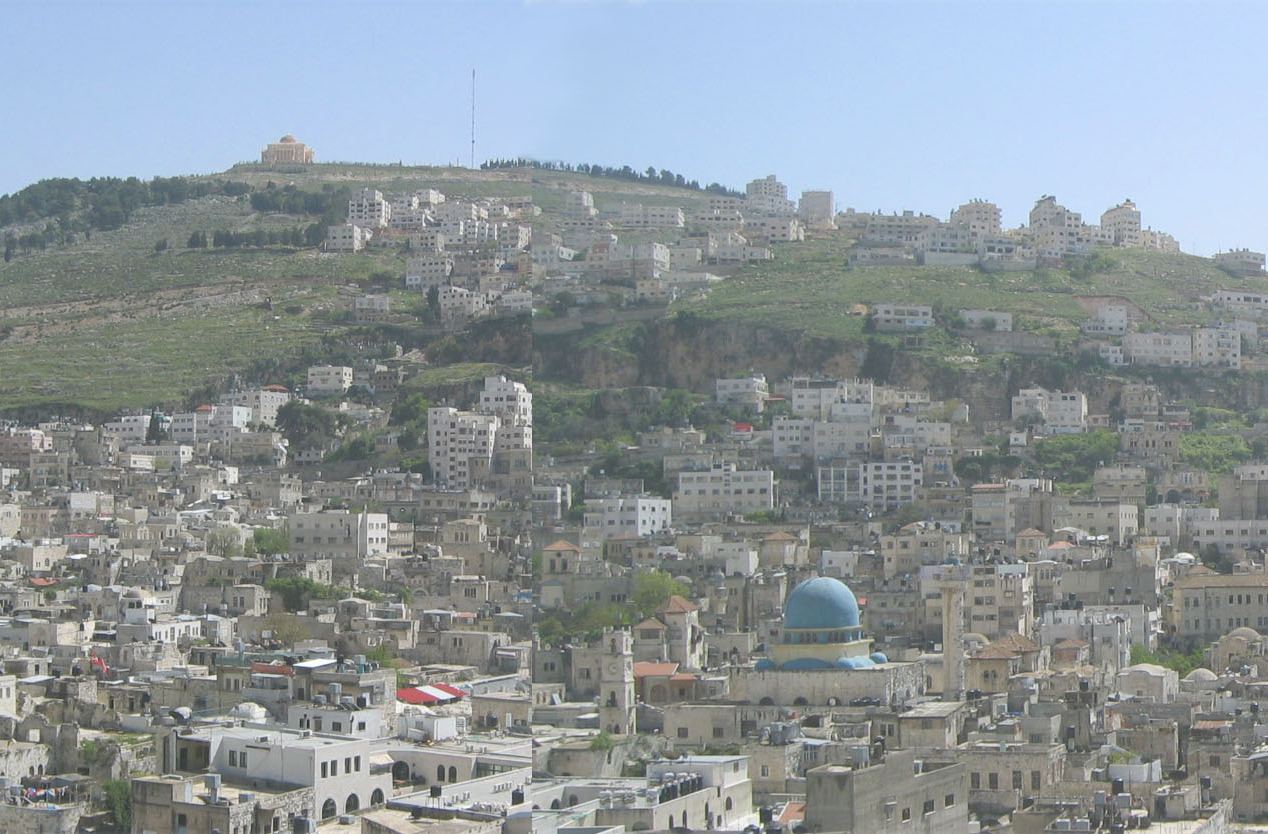
Old City of Nablus and Mount Gerizim in background

Mount Gerizim (/ˈɡɛrɪzɪm/ GHERR-iz-im; Samaritan Hebrew: ࠄࠟࠓࠬࠂࠟࠓࠩࠆࠝࠉࠌ, romanized: ʾĀ̊rgā̊rīzem; Hebrew: הַר גְּרִזִים, romanized: Har Gərīzīm; Arabic: جَبَل جَرِزِيم, romanized: Jabal Jarizīm, or جَبَلُ ٱلطُّورِ, Jabal at-Ṭūr) is one of two mountains near the Palestinian city of Nablus and the biblical city of Shechem, located in the north of Palestine's West Bank. It forms the southern side of the valley in which Nablus is situated, the northern side being formed by Mount Ebal. The mountain is one of the highest peaks in the West Bank and rises to 881 m (2,890 ft) above sea level, 70 m (230 ft) lower than Mount Ebal. The mountain is particularly steep on the northern side, is sparsely covered at the top with shrubbery, and lower down there is a spring with a high yield of fresh water. The mountain is mentioned in the Hebrew Bible as the place where, upon first entering the Promised Land after the Exodus, the Israelites performed ceremonies of blessings, as they had been instructed by Moses.

In Samaritan tradition, it is the oldest and most central mountain in the world, towering above the Great Flood and providing the first land for Noah's disembarkation. Samaritans believe that Mount Gerizim is the location where Abraham almost sacrificed his son Isaac. Jews, on the other hand, consider the location of the near-sacrifice to be Mount Moriah. Samaritans regard Mount Gerizim, rather than Jerusalem's Temple Mount, as the location chosen by God for a holy temple. A Samaritan Temple was located on Mount Gerizim from the 5th century BCE until it was destroyed in the 2nd century BCE. Mount Gerizim continues to be the centre of Samaritan religion, and Samaritans ascend it three times a year: at Passover, Shavuot and Sukkot.

The Samaritan village of Kiryat Luza and an Israeli settlement, Har Brakha, are situated on the ridge of Mount Gerizim. During the First Intifada in 1987, many Samaritan families relocated from Nablus to Mount Gerizim to avoid the violence. Today, about half of the remaining Samaritans live near Gerizim, mostly in the village of Kiryat Luza.

== Etymology ==
The name of the mountain may mean "mountain of the Girzites", a tribe of Philistia that, according to the Hebrew Bible, was conquered by David. Another possible meaning is "mountain cut in two".

== History ==
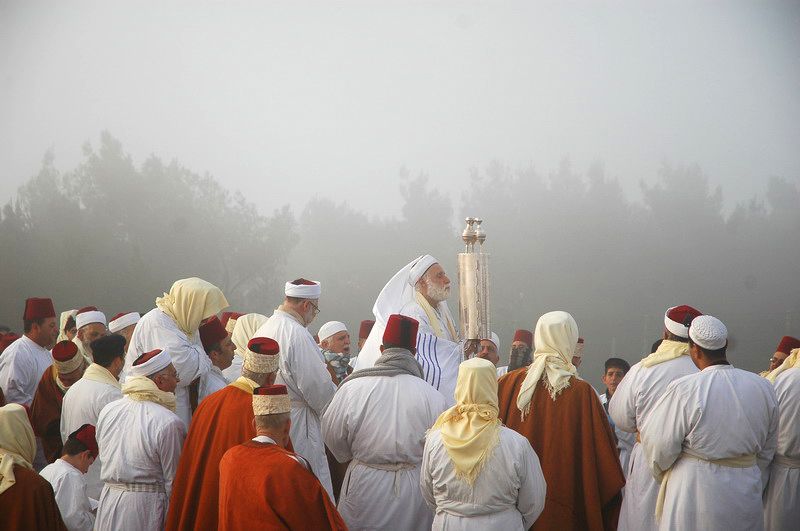
Samaritans' Passover pilgrimage on Mount Gerizim

Passover on Gerizim in the 1890s

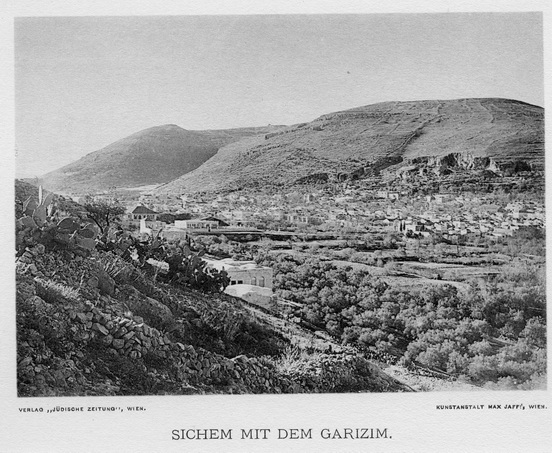
Old view of Nablus and Mount Gerizim

=== Persian period ===
Sanballat I established a Samaritan temple dedicated to Yahweh at the summit of Mount Gerizim in the mid-to-late 5th century BCE. Josephus, writing six centuries later, claims to describe the construction of the Temple on Gerizim, saying it was modeled on the Temple in Jerusalem. A city of more than 10,000 inhabitants named Luzah (modern-day Kiryat Luza) was situated adjacent to the temple.

=== Hellenistic period ===
During the 3rd century BCE, the Samaritans built an ancient city adjacent to Mount Gerizim, which became the capital of the Samaritan community. In 168 BCE, Antiochus IV Epiphanes constructed a temple for the worship of Zeus Xenios (Zeus as the patron of hospitality and guests, avenger of wrongs done to strangers) on Mount Gerizim.

Religious rivalry between Samaritans and Jews led to the destruction of the Mount Gerizim Temple by the Jews in 112–111 BCE, on orders of John Hyrcanus. Even after the destruction of their temple by the Jews, Mount Gerizim continued to be the holiest place for the Samaritans, as mentioned in the Gospel of John in the New Testament. Coins produced by a Roman mint situated in Nablus, dated to 138–161 CE, seemingly depict the destroyed Samaritan temple, showing a huge temple complex, statues, and a staircase leading from Nablus to the temple.

=== Roman Empire ===
In 36 CE, unrest flared in Samaria when a Samaritan prophet (possibly Dositheos) rallied Samaritans to Mount Gerizim, promising to show them the sacred vessels buried there by Moses. Pontius Pilate, Roman governor of Judaea, alarmed by the growing assembly, deployed troops to block their ascent. This led to clashes, fatalities, and arrests, prompting Samaritan leaders to accuse Pilate of brutality. In response, Lucius Vitellius, the legate of Syria, deposed Pilate (replacing Pilate with Marcellus) and sent him to Rome for investigation by Emperor Tiberius, who died before Pilate's arrival.

In the summer of 67, during the First Jewish–Roman War, a large group of armed Samaritans gathered on Mount Gerizim. Vespasian dispatched Legio V Macedonica (commanded by Cerialis) to disarm and disperse them. While some surrendered upon the Romans' arrival, the majority chose to fight.

In the late 4th century, when Christianity became the official religion of the Roman Empire, Samaritans were barred from worshiping on Mount Gerizim. In 475, a Christian church was built on its summit. In 484, during the reign of Emperor Zeno, a martyrium-type octagonal church dedicated to the Theotokos (the God-bearing Virgin Mary) was erected at the site. In 529, Justinian I made Samaritanism illegal and arranged for a protective wall to be constructed around the church. As a result, the same year, Julianus ben Sabar led a pro-Samaritan revolt and by 530 had captured most of Samaria, destroying churches and killing priests and officials. However, in 531, after Justinian enlisted the help of Ghassanids, the revolt was completely quashed, and surviving Samaritans were mostly enslaved or exiled. In 533, Justinian had a castle constructed on Mount Gerizim to protect the church from raids by the few Samaritans left in the area.

According to Abu'l-Fath, Continuation of the Samaritan Chronicle, during Sukkot in the seventh year of Abbasid Caliph al-Mutawakkil's reign (855), the governor of Nablus forbade Samaritans from praying aloud and blowing the shofar. However, the following Thursday, they ascended the mountain and prayed loudly without interruption.

== Archaeology ==
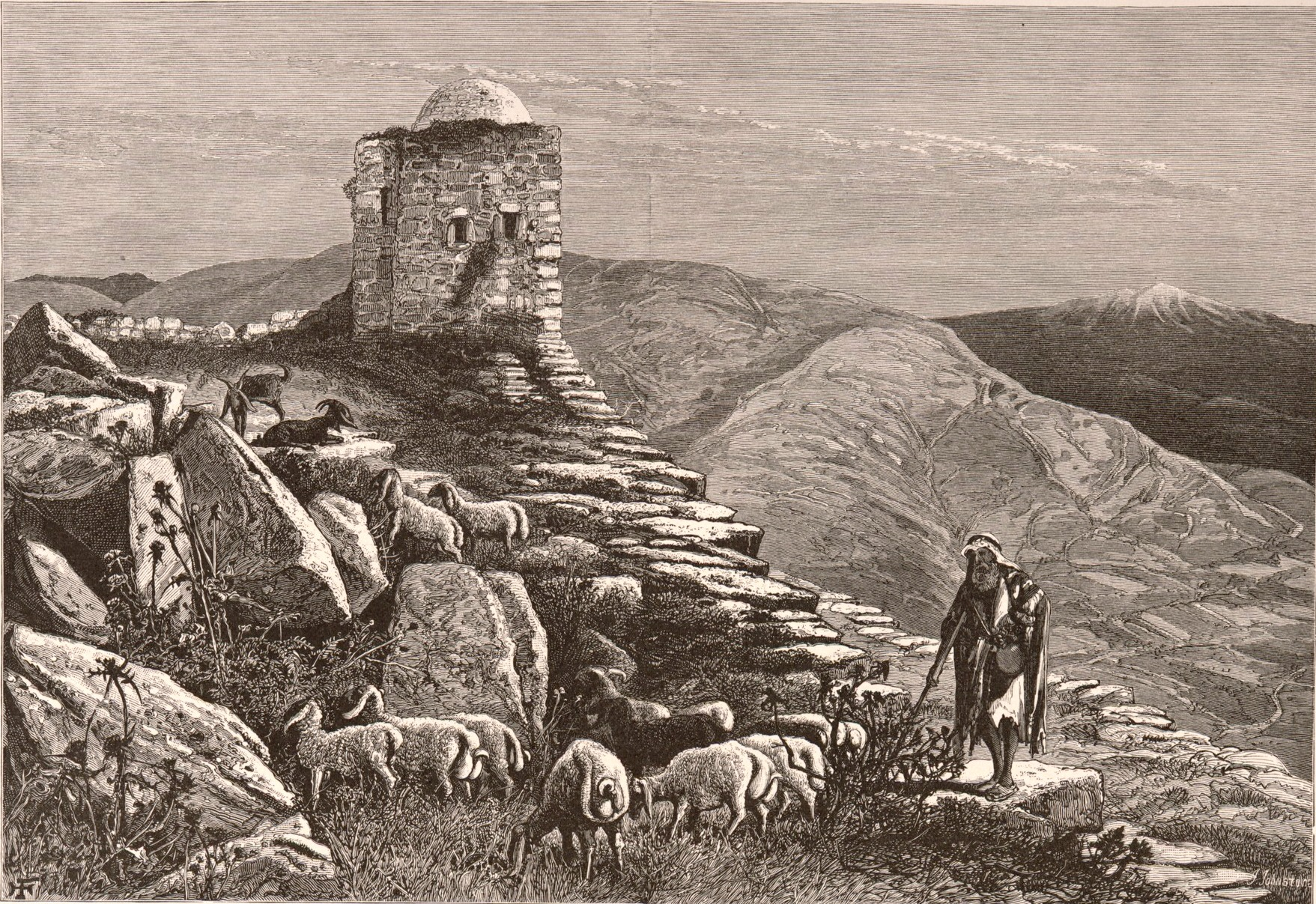
Ruins on Mount Gerizim c. 1880

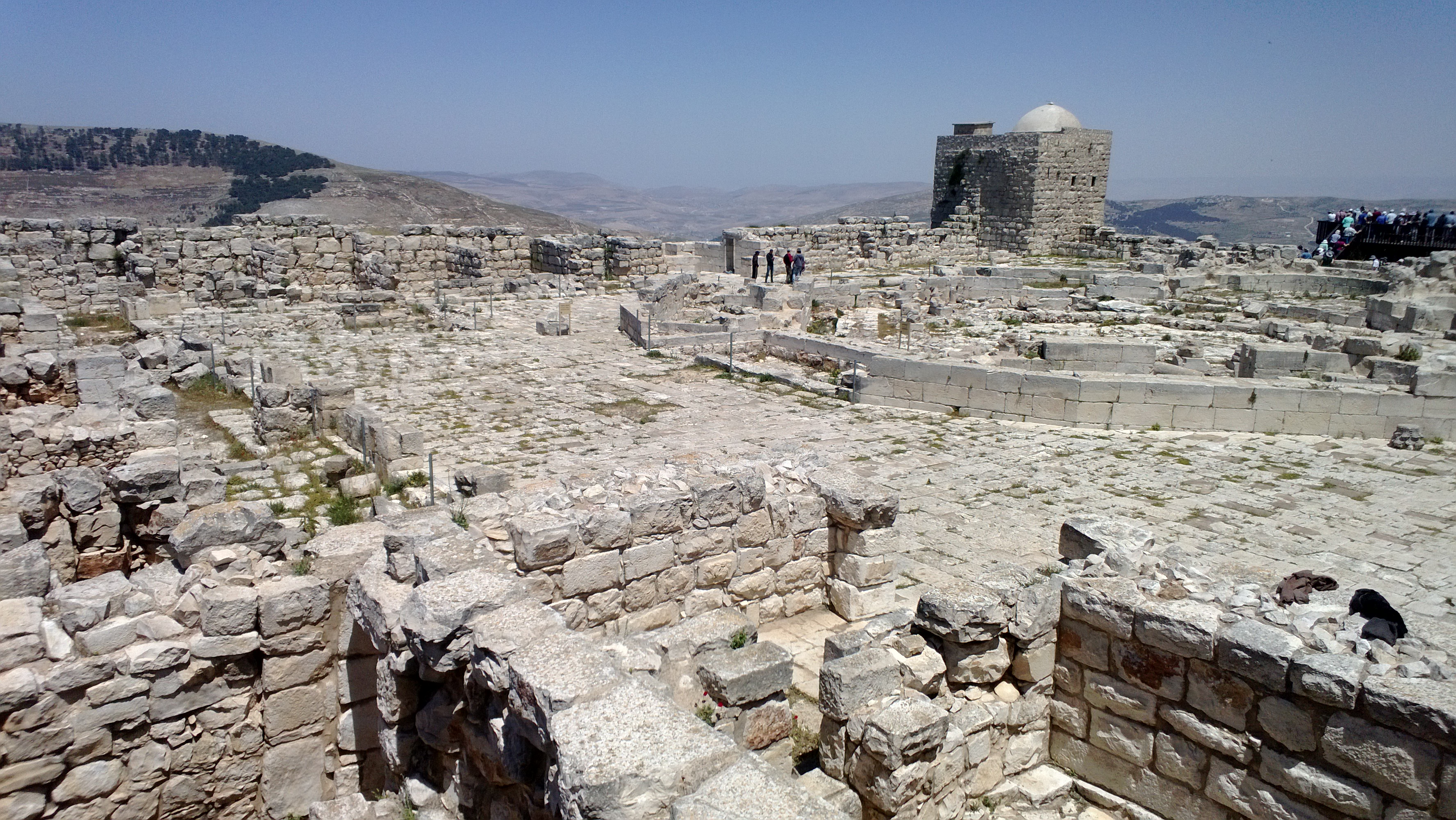
Archaeological remnants on Mount Gerizim's summit

Excavations at the site were initiated in 1983 and continued until 2006, yielding tens of thousands of finds. Remnants found there identified that a Samaritan temple existed atop Mount Gerizim by the mid-5th century BCE and that it was destroyed and rebuilt in the early 2nd century BCE, only to be destroyed again in 111–110 BCE by Jewish forces. The archeological finds have shown that the precincts of the Samaritan temple, not including its gates, measured roughly 98 square metres (1,050 square feet). Inside the perimeter, thousands of pottery vessels and burned bones of animal sacrifices were found – sheep, goats, cattle, and doves – as well as many stones with inscriptions containing the Tetragrammaton (the name of God).

Today, the archaeological area on Mount Gerizim includes visible remains of the Samaritan sacred precinct, parts of the ancient settlement, and later Byzantine structures. Visible remains include walls, streets, residential buildings, public areas, the octagonal Byzantine church and its fortifications, as well as traditional Samaritan locations associated with the Binding of Isaac and the Foundation Stone. A domed structure known as Sheikh Ghanem's Tomb stands near the northeastern part of the site and overlooks Nablus, Mount Ebal, and the surrounding hills.

In 475, a Christian church was built on the summit. As a result of the fortified church and the previous Samaritan temple, extensive ruins still exist at the somewhat plateau-like top of Gerizim. The line of the wall around the church can easily be seen, as can portions of the former castle, and initial archaeological study of the site postulated that the castle built by Justinian had used stones from an earlier structure on the site, probably the Samaritan temple. In the centre of the plateau is a smooth surface, containing a hollow.

The excavation, initiated when the site was in the possession of Jordan and continued under Israeli rule, uncovered Corinthian columns, a large rectangular platform surrounded by walls 2 m (6 ft 7 in) thick and 9 m (30 ft), and a staircase leading down from the platform to a marbled esplanade. The complex also has a series of cisterns in which ceramics dated to the late Roman period were found. These discoveries are now called "structure A", and have been dated to the time of Hadrian from excavated coins and external literary evidence. Underneath these remains was found a large stone structure built on top of the bedrock. This structure, now known as "structure B", has no internal rooms or dividing walls and consists almost entirely of uncut limestone slabs fitted together without any mortar. Structure B was surrounded by a courtyard similar to the platform above it, and from ceramics found in a cistern cut into the bedrock at its northern side, it was dated to during or just before the Hellenistic period. The excavating archaeologist considered structure B to be the altar built by the Samaritans in the 5th or 6th century.

== Biblical appearances ==
=== In the Hebrew Bible ===
According to the Book of Deuteronomy, when they first entered Canaan the Israelites celebrated the event with ceremonies of blessings that took place on Mount Gerizim, and cursings on nearby Mount Ebal. The Pulpit Commentary suggests that these mountains were probably selected because they are located roughly in the center of Israel. A commentary in the Cambridge Bible for Schools and Colleges argues that "the face of Gerizim, the mount of blessing, is the more fertile; the opposite face of Ebal, the mount of curse, much the more bare", but the Pulpit Commentary states that both Gerizim and Ebal are "equally barren-looking, though neither is wholly destitute of culture and vegetation".

The Masoretic Text version of Deuteronomy says that Moses had also commanded the Israelites to build an altar on Mount Ebal, constructed from natural (rather than cut) stones, to place stones there and whiten them with lime, to make sacrificial offerings on the altar, eat there, and write the Mosaic Law in stones there. The Samaritan Pentateuch version of Deuteronomy, as well as an ancient manuscript of the biblical text found in the Qumran Caves, both contain the same text as the Masoretic Text, with the only difference being the name "Gerizim", instead of "Ebal", therefore stating that Moses commanded the building of the altar on Mount Gerizim. Recent work on the Dead Sea Scrolls, which include the oldest surviving manuscripts of Deuteronomy, further supports the accuracy of the Samaritan Pentateuch's designation of Mount Gerizim, rather than Mount Ebal, as the first location in the Promised Land where Moses commanded an altar to be built.

All versions of Deuteronomy then have Moses specifying how the Israelites should split into two groups. The tribes of Simeon, Levi, Judah, Issachar, Joseph, and Benjamin were to go to Gerizim to pronounce blessings, while those of Reuben, Gad, Asher, Zebulun, Dan, and Naphtali were to remain on Ebal to pronounce curses.

The altar on Mount Ebal is again mentioned in the Book of Joshua, when, after the Battle of Ai, the Israelites build an altar of unhewn stones and make offerings on it, and Joshua inscribes the Law of Moses on the stones. The Israelites then split into the two groups specified in the Book of Deuteronomy to pronounce blessings on Mount Gerizim and curses on Mount Ebal.

Mount Gerizim is also the setting of the first parable in the Bible. According to a narrative in the Book of Judges, Jotham ascends to the summit of Mount Gerizim and delivers the "Parable of the Bramble King" to the people of Shechem. The parable is a story about the trees who wanted to appoint the bramble (possibly Ziziphus spina-christi, a thorny tree with crooked branches) as their king, an allusion to the people of Shechem who wanted to make the ungodly and treacherous Abimelech their king.

=== In the Gospel of John ===
In the Gospel of John, in his discussion with the Samaritan woman at the well, Jesus discusses the merits of worshipping at the Mount Gerizim Temple (as the Samaritans did) versus at the Temple in Jerusalem (as the Jews then did).

== See also ==
- Samaritan revolts

== Cited works ==
- Berlin, Adele (2011). The Oxford Dictionary of the Jewish Religion. Oxford, UK: Oxford University Press. p. 330. ISBN 978-0199730049.
- Cheyne, Thomas Kelly; Black, John Sutherland, eds. (1901). Encyclopedia Biblica. Vol. II:E to K. London: The MacMillan Company.
- Dar, Shimon (2010). "Archaeological Aspects of Samaritan Research in Israel". Religious Diversity in Late Antiquity. Leiden: Brill. ISBN 978-9004180000.
- Davies, James (1871). "Abimelech's Judgeship". Local Examination Manual. Notes on Judges. London: George Philip and Son.
- de Hemmer Gudme, Anne Katrine (2013). "3. The Votive Inscriptions from Mount Gerizim". Before the God in this Place for Good Remembrance. Berlin: Walter de Gruyter. pp. 52–90. doi:10.1515/9783110301878.52. ISBN 978-3110301878.
- Demandt, Alexander (2012). Pontius Pilatus (in German). Munich: Verlag C.H. Beck. ISBN 978-3406633621.
- Faust, Avraham (2015). "The Emergence of Iron Age Israel: On Origins and Habitus". In Levy, Thomas E.; Schneider, Thomas; Propp, William H.C. (eds.). Israel's Exodus in Transdisciplinary Perspective: Text, Archaeology, Culture, and Geoscience. Quantitative Methods in the Humanities and Social Sciences. Springer. pp. 467–482. doi:10.1007/978-3-319-04768-3. ISBN 978-3319047683.
- Hjelm, Ingrid (2010). "Mt. Gerizim and Samaritans in Recent Research". In Winkler, Waltraud; Mor, Menachem; Reiterer, Friedrich V. (eds.). Samaritans: Past and Present. Berlin: Walter de Gruyter. pp. 25–44. ISBN 978-3110194975.
- Levy-Rubin, Milka (2002). "The Samaritans during the early Muslim period, according to the Continuation to the Chronicle of Abu'l-Fath". In Stern, Ephraim; Eshel, Hanan (eds.). The Samaritans (in Hebrew). Yad Ben-Zvi Press. ISBN 9652172022.
- Magen, Yitzakh (2007). "The Dating of the First Phase of the Samaritan Temple on Mount Gerizim in Light of the Archaeological Evidence". In Lipschits, Oded; Knoppers, Gary N.; Albertz, Rainer (eds.). Judah and the Judeans in the Fourth Century B.C.E. University Park, Pennsylvania: Eisenbrauns. pp. 157–212. doi:10.5325/j.ctv1bxh4q2.13. ISBN 978-1575061306.
- Rogers, Guy MacLean (2021). For the Freedom of Zion: The great revolt of Jews against Romans, 66–74 CE. New Haven: Yale University Press. ISBN 978-0300248135.
