= Kiryat Luza =

Israelite Samaritan village in West Bank

Coordinates: 32.203399°N 35.270081°E

Kiryat Luza: قرية لوزة; קרית לוזה; ࠒࠓࠉࠕ ࠋࠅࠆࠄ
- Village
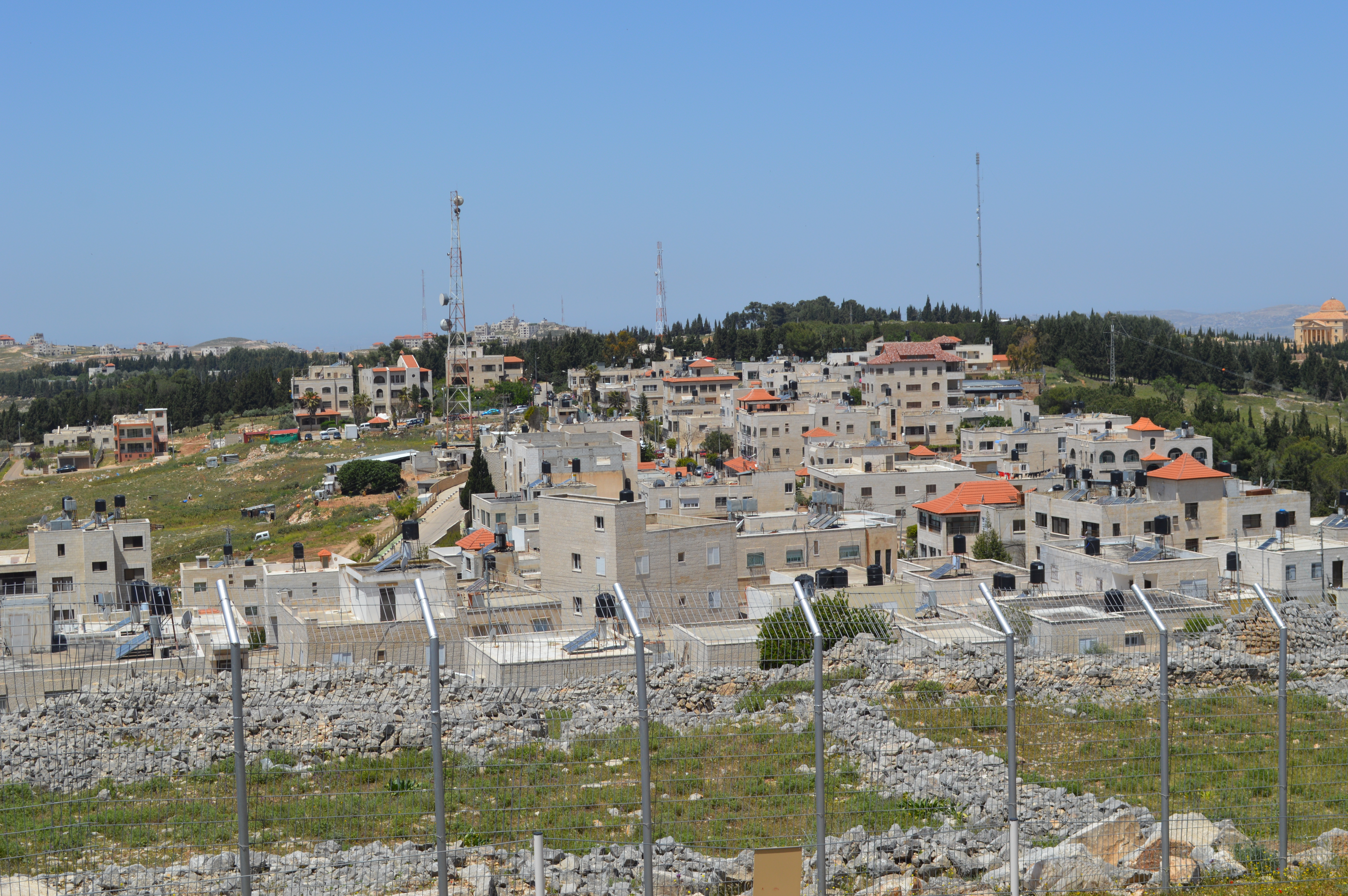
- Interactive map of Kiryat Luza
- Location within the West Bank Location within the de jure State of Palestine
- Country: Palestine
- Region: West Bank
- Governorate: Nablus

Population
  - Total: 380
- Time zone: UTC+2:00 (Palestine Standard Time)

Kiryat Luza (Arabic: قرية لوزة, Hebrew: קרית לוזה, Samaritan Hebrew: ࠒࠓࠉࠕ ࠋࠅࠆࠄ) is an Israelite Samaritan village situated on Mount Gerizim near the city of Nablus in the West Bank. It is within Area B of the West Bank, and as a result is under the joint control of Israel and the Palestinian National Authority. Kiryat Luza is home to roughly half of the world's total Samaritan population, with the other half located in the Israeli city of Holon.

== Geography ==
The village is adjacent to the Jewish Israeli settlement of Har Brakha. The village location on the mountain overlooks Al-Najah National University, the city of Nablus, and the Balata refugee camp.

== History ==
Until the 1980s, most Samaritans in the West Bank resided in Nablus proper, below Mount Gerizim, and began to relocate to Kiryat Luza due to a spike in violence throughout Israel and the Palestinian Territories during the First Intifada; the Israeli military maintains an active presence in the area (see Israeli occupation of the West Bank).

== Culture ==
The village Samaritan Museum is a museum in Kiryat Luza, it was opened in 1996 in the village, with small funding from the Palestinian Authority, it contains descriptions of the life of Samaritans, as well as historical documents and artifacts. As well as a synagogue, and a tahini factory.

The village also contains a school that teaches the Samaritan religion, it was established in 1990, closed in 1998 due to low attendance, and then reopened in 2002.

The Mount Gerizim International Peace Center is also located within the village, it offers the "Samaritan Medal for Peace and Humanitarian achievements", since 2005, it is given to "the most prominent activists of peace and humanity".

== Gallery ==
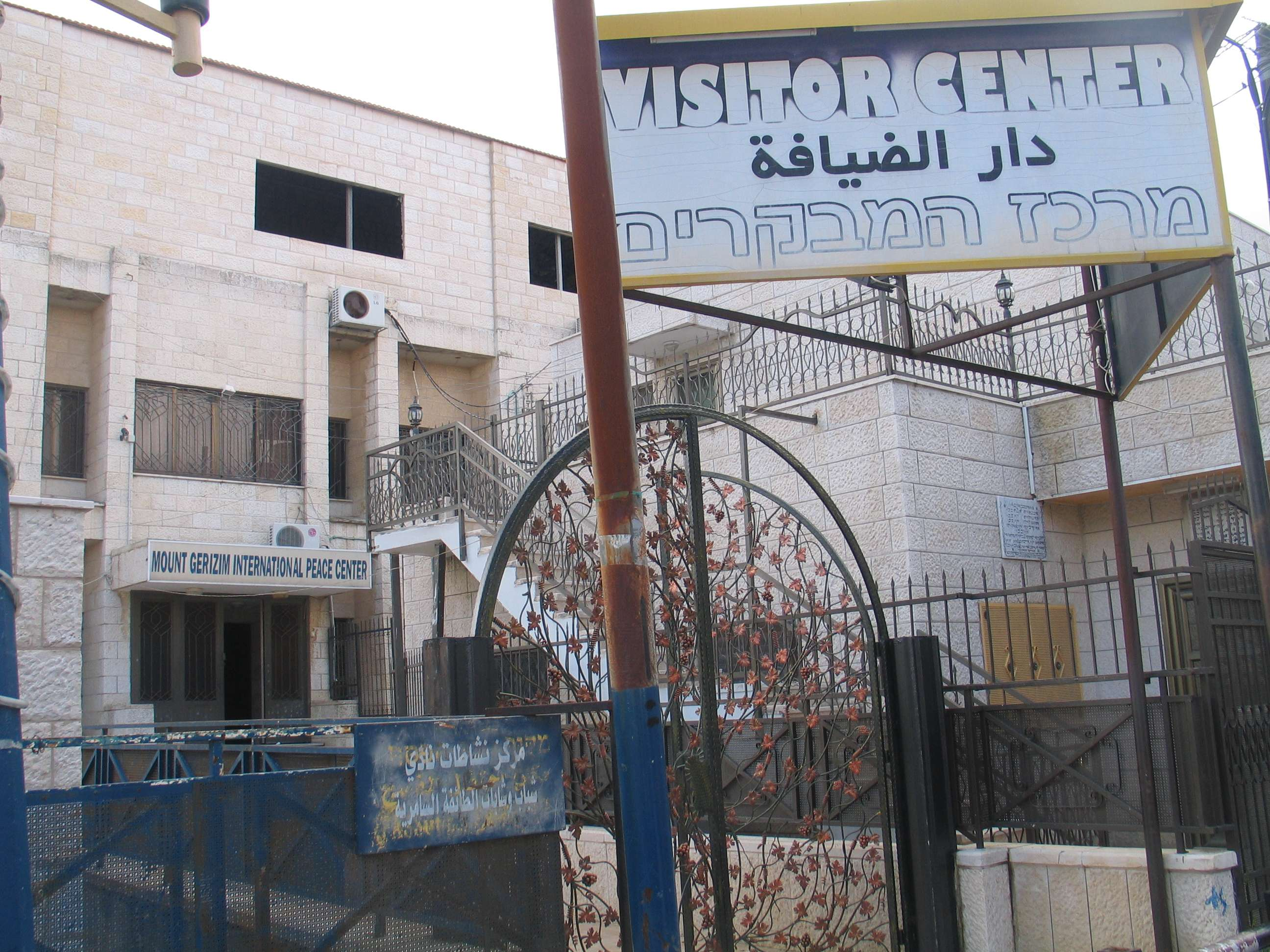
The Mount Gerizim International Peace Center and the visitor center

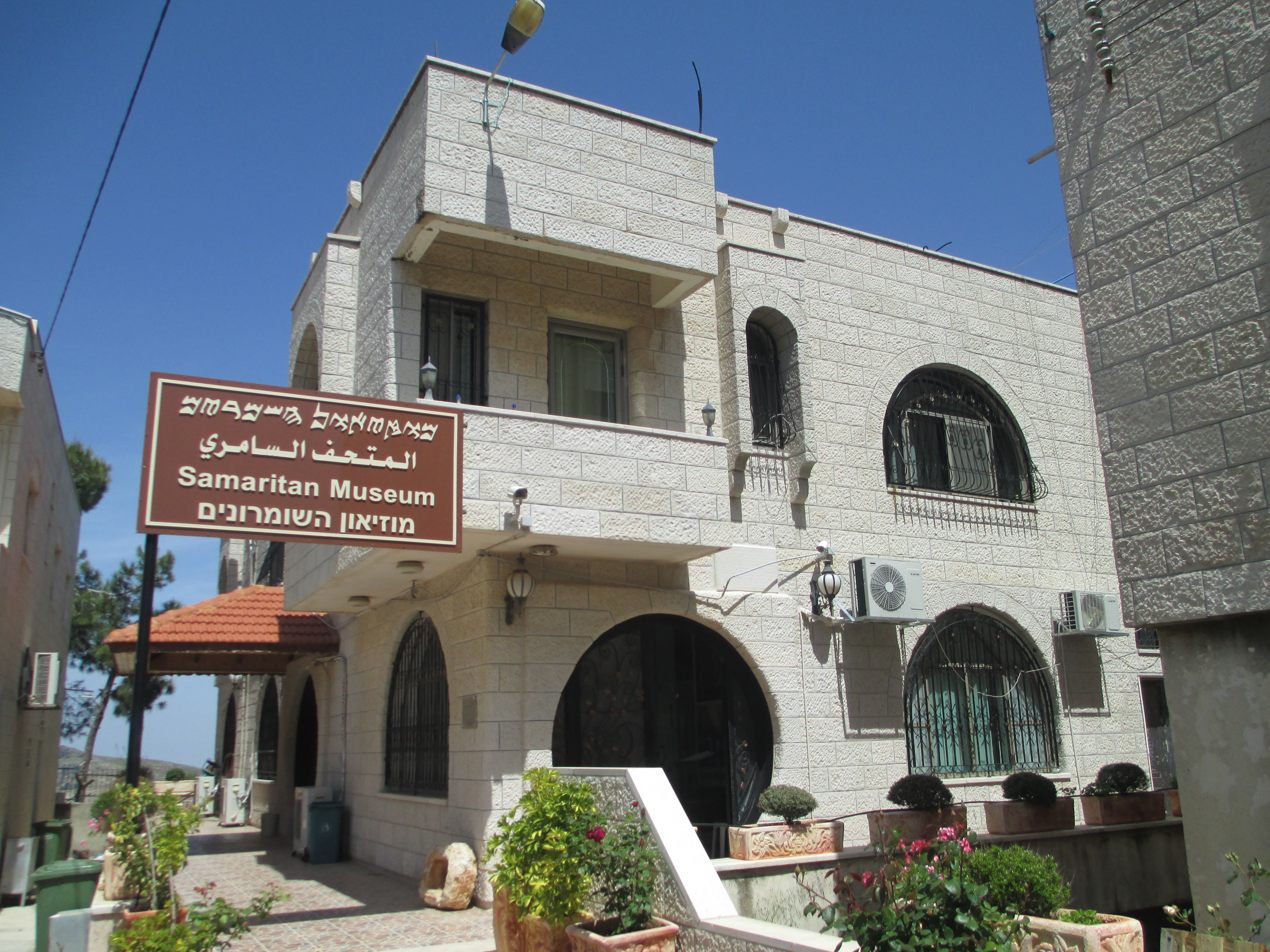
The Samaritan Museum, notice the four language sign

== See also ==
- Neve Pinchas
