= Neve Pinchas =

Israelite Samaritan neighborhood in Israel

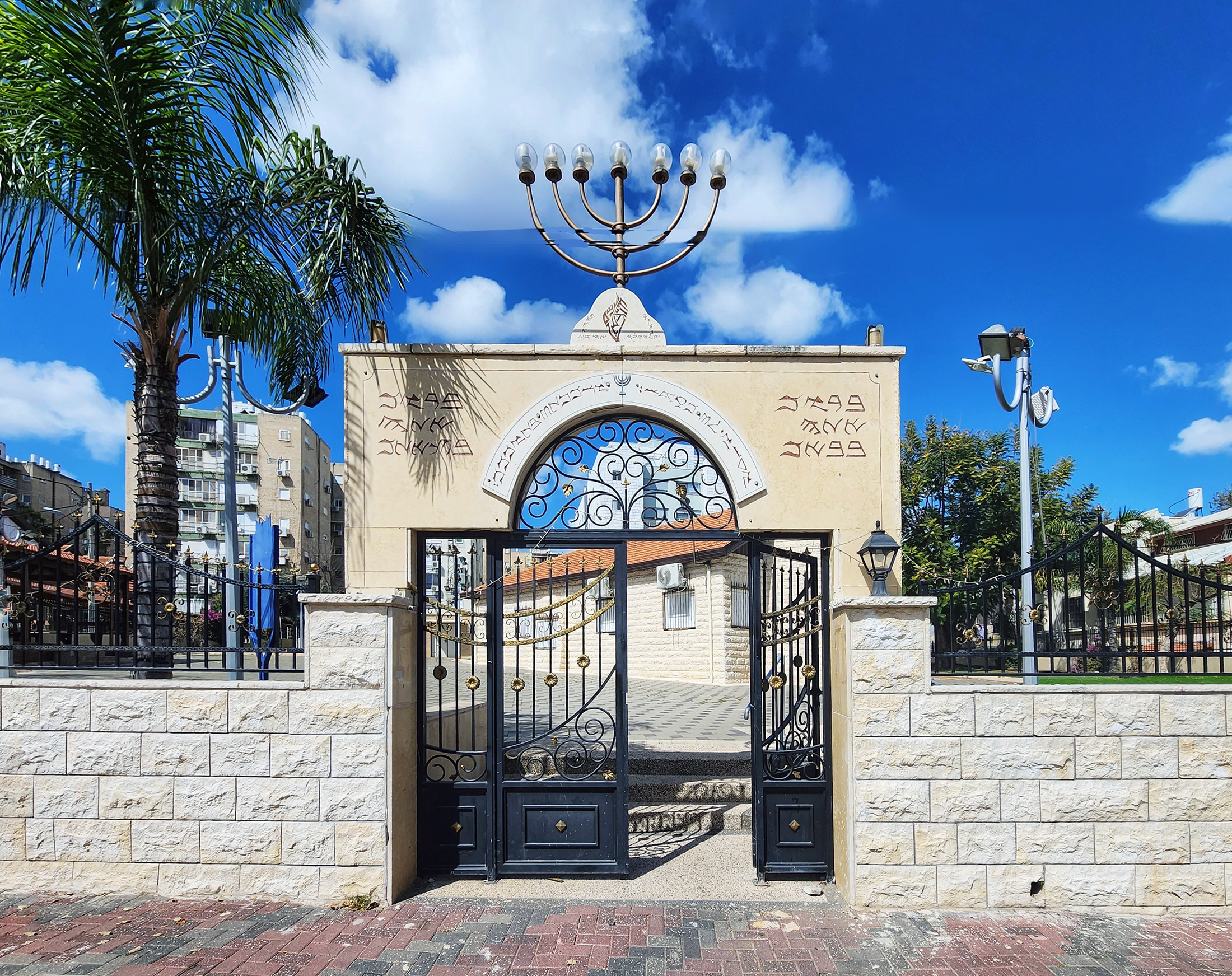
Samaritan synagogue in Neve Pinchas

Neve Pinchas (Hebrew: נווה פנחס) is an Israelite Samaritan neighborhood in the city of Holon, in the Tel Aviv District, Israel.

== Etymology ==
The quarter was named Neve Pinchas after Pinhas Ben-Abraham, the high priest of the Samaritan community. Until 1992, the neighborhood was called Neve Marka.

== History ==
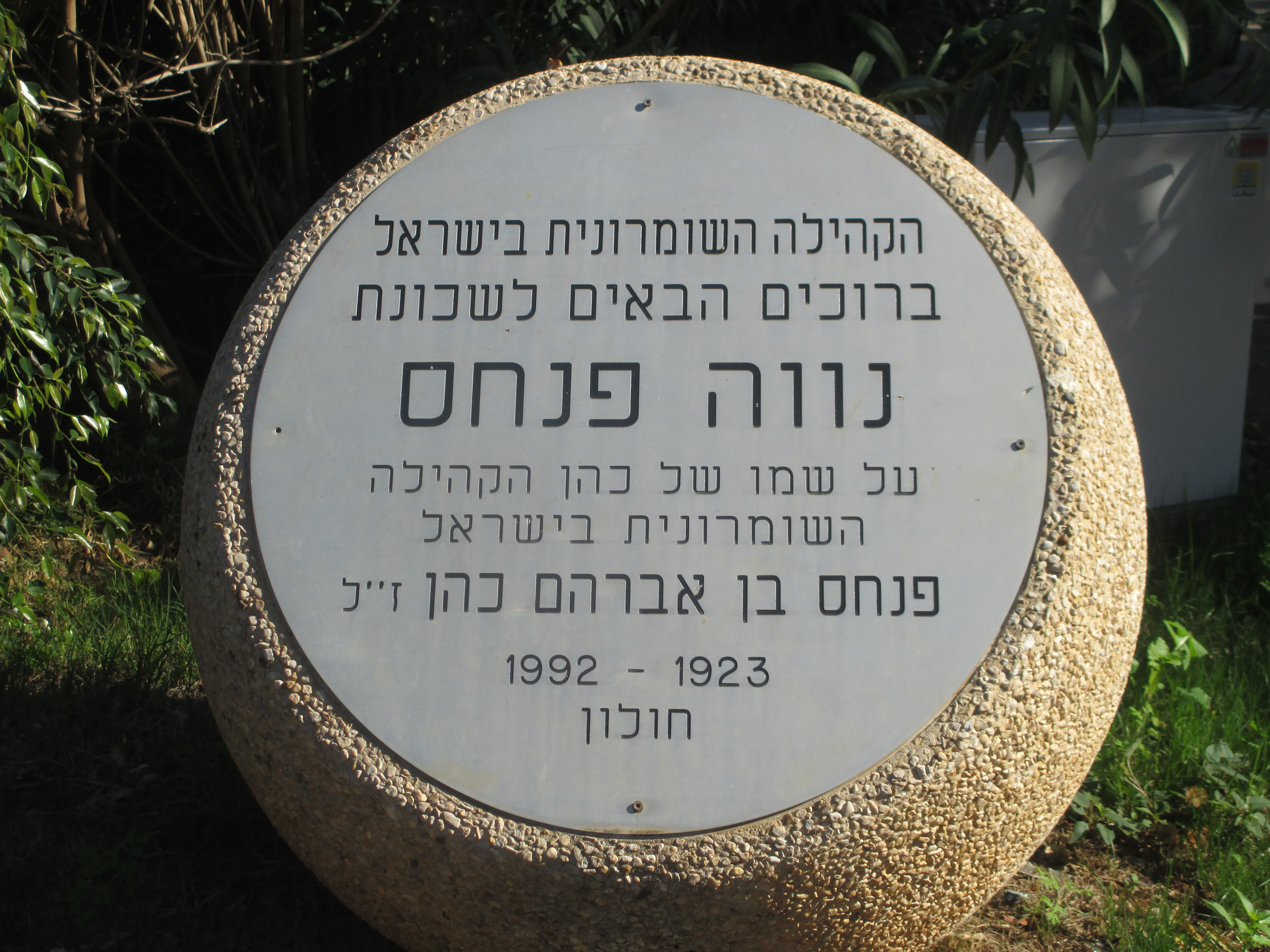
Commemorative plaque in Neve Pinchas.

When the State of Israel was established in 1948, about 60 Samaritans lived there, who were not concentrated in a communal framework, but were scattered in the cities of Holon, Tel Aviv, Ramat Gan and Rishon LeZion. Member of Knesset Yitzhak Ben-Zvi, a scholar of Israel's identity and a good friend of the Samaritan community, suggested bringing them together so that they could live as a community and preserve their Samaritan uniqueness.

Upon his election as president of the State of Israel, Ben Zvi and the mayors of Holon, Dr. Chaim Kogel and Panchas Ilon, allocated the area designated for the construction of a Samaritan neighborhood in the city and also helped finance the construction of the first houses in the neighborhood in 1954. That year, about half of the Samaritan community moved to Israel (about ~400 people) to live in the neighborhood.

In the early 1960s, a synagogue was inaugurated in the neighborhood. After the Six-Day War, the neighborhood took in several Samaritan families from Nablus, including families of priests. Until then there were no Samaritan priests in the neighborhood (and Holon in general). At the end of the 1990s, another, smaller synagogue was inaugurated, which was significantly renovated in 2006. In addition, several new residences were built in recent years following the natural increase of the community. A number of Samaritan families in Holon live in the neighborhoods adjacent to Neve Pinchas: Neve Erazim, Neot Yehudit and Kiryat Sharet.

== See also ==
- Kiryat Luza
