= Nader Sadaqa =

Palestinian militant and fighter

Nader Saleh Mamdouh Sadaqa (Arabic: نادر صالح ممدوح صدقة; born 12 June 1977) is a Palestinian Samaritan, known for being the only member of the Samaritan community to be convicted by Israel. He was sentenced to six life terms and an additional 45 years for his role in deadly attacks against Israelis. After spending more than 20 years in prison, he was released in 2025 in a hostages-and-prisoners exchange deal between Hamas and Israel.

== Early life and education ==
Nader Sadaqa was born on 12 June 1977 on the slopes of Mount Gerizim, near the city of Nablus, northern West Bank, to a Samaritan family. He received his education in Nablus schools before enrolling at An-Najah National University, where he studied history and archaeology. During his studies, he became active in student politics through the Progressive Student Labor Front, affiliated with the Popular Front for the Liberation of Palestine (PFLP).

== Militance and attacks ==
Sadaqa carries three citizenships: Palestinian, Israeli, and Jordanian. He has said he might have "lived a comfortable life", but felt compelled to struggle for Palestinian liberation. He identifies as Samaritan by religious community, "Arab by heritage, influenced by Islamic culture, and Palestinian by nationality."

With the outbreak of the Second Intifada in 2000, Sadaqa left his studies and joined the Abu Ali Mustafa Brigades, the military wing of the PFLP, where he became one of its leaders. In 2003, he was attributed with participating in several deadly attacks against Israeli targets: the attack in February on Mount Gerizim, where two soldiers were killed; an attack on the Beqat base in April, where two soldiers were killed and eight were wounded; and the Geha Interchange bombing in December, in which four civilians were killed and another 26 were wounded, and which the PFLP claimed responsibility for.

== Arrest, trial and release ==
On 17 August 2004, at the age of 27, Sadaqa was arrested by Israeli forces in the refugee camp of Ein Beit al-Ma', located west of Nablus. He was sentenced to six life terms and an additional 45 years, based on charges related to the 2003 attacks. By 2025, he had entered his 22nd year in Israeli prisons until his release on 14 October 2025, as part of a deal in which Israel released Palestinian prisoners in exchange for Israeli hostages held by Hamas, under the condition of deportation to Egypt. In an interview with The New Arab, Sadaqa stated that a Palestinian who does not openly resist or reject the occupation is "incomplete in freedom, humanity, and Palestinian identity".

== See also ==
- Palestinians in Israeli custody
