= Samaritans =

Ethnoreligious group native to the Levant

ࠔࠠࠌࠝࠓࠩࠉࠌ שׁוֹמְרוֹנִים سَّامِرِيُّون
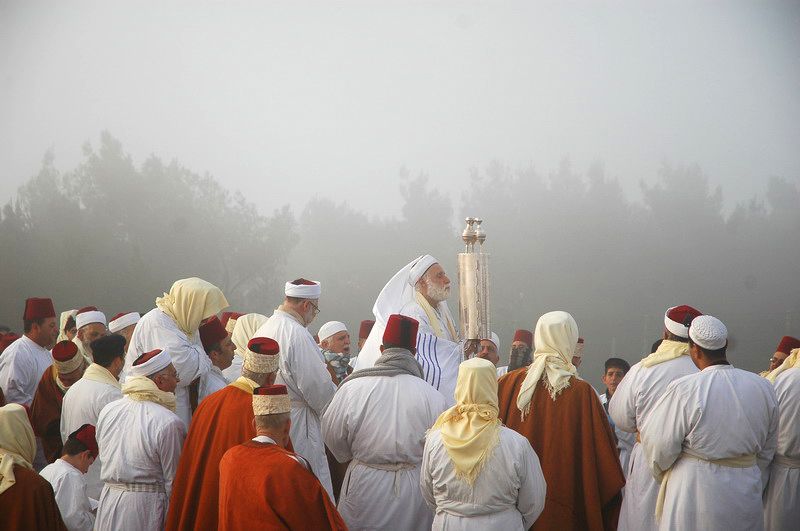
- Samaritans marking Passover on Mount Gerizim, near modern Nablus and ancient Shechem, 2006

Total population
- ≈900 (2024)

Regions with significant populations
- Israel (Neve Pinchas, Holon): 460 (2021)
- Palestine (Kiryat Luza, West Bank (Note: Samaritan residents in the West Bank have dual citizenship under the Palestinian National Authority (Sabella 2011, p. 75, n.4).)): 380 (2021)

Languages
- Spoken: Modern Hebrew and Levantine Arabic; Liturgy: Samaritan Hebrew and Samaritan Aramaic

Religion
- Samaritanism

Related ethnic groups
- Jews, Palestinians, and other Semitic-speaking peoples

Samaritans (/səˈmærɪtənz/; Samaritan Hebrew: ࠔࠌࠓࠉࠌ, Šåmerīm; Hebrew: שומרונים, Šomronim; Arabic: سامريون, Sāmiriyyūn), often preferring to be called Israelite Samaritans, are an ethnoreligious group originating from the Hebrews and Israelites of the ancient Near East. They are indigenous to Samaria, a historical region of ancient Israel and Judah. They are adherents of Samaritanism, an Abrahamic, monotheistic, and ethnic religion that developed alongside Judaism.

The Samaritans identify as descendants of the Israelite tribes of Ephraim, Manasseh, and the priestly tribe of Levi. They maintain that they represent the most authentic continuation of the Mosaic covenant. In contemporary scholarship, the Samaritan community is generally understood to have emerged in Samaria from populations associated with the former northern Kingdom of Israel, alongside populations of Mesopotamian origin, with its distinctive identity taking shape during the Persian and Hellenistic periods. The community developed in close but often contentious relationship with the Jewish people, who emerged primarily from the population of the southern Kingdom of Judah.

Samaritans recognize only the Samaritan Torah as sacred scripture, rejecting most of the later Jewish canon as well as rabbinic tradition, and their central theological distinction from Judaism is the belief that Mount Gerizim, not the Temple Mount in Jerusalem, is God's chosen sanctuary. Their religion is centered on the hereditary high priesthood, strict observance of biblical law and festivals, and pilgrimages to Mount Gerizim, most famously the Passover sacrifice.

In classical antiquity, the Samaritans were the principal population of Samaria, but their numbers were drastically reduced following a series of failed revolts and severe Byzantine repression in the 5th and 6th centuries CE. Their numbers declined further through Christianization under the Byzantines and gradual Islamization following the Muslim conquest of Syria. By the 12th century, Benjamin of Tudela estimated that only about 1,900 Samaritans remained in Palestine and Syria. Their numbers reached a record low of around 100 people during the early modern period, but their population has grown since, reaching around 900 people as of 2024; they are one of the world's smallest surviving ethnoreligious groups, concentrated mainly in Kiryat Luza on Mount Gerizim near Nablus (ancient Shechem) and in the neighborhood of Neve Pinchas in Holon near Tel Aviv.

== Attributes ==
As of 2024, the Samaritan community numbered around 900 people, split between Israel (some 460 in Holon, mostly in the neighborhood of Neve Pinchas) and Palestine (some 380 in Kiryat Luza). The Samaritans in Kiryat Luza speak South Levantine Arabic, while those in Holon primarily speak Modern Hebrew. For liturgical purposes, they also use Samaritan Hebrew and Samaritan Aramaic, both of which are written in the Samaritan script. According to Samaritan tradition, the position of the community's leading Samaritan High Priest has continued without interruption for the last 3600 years, beginning with the Hebrew prophet Aaron. Since 2013, the 133rd Samaritan High Priest has been Aabed-El ben Asher ben Matzliach.

In censuses, Israeli law classifies the Samaritans as a distinct religious community. However, Rabbinic literature rejected the Samaritans' Halakhic Jewishness because they refused to renounce their belief that Mount Gerizim was the historical holy site of the Israelites. (Note: Tractate Kutim 2:8: "They can only be accepted if they renounce Mount Gerizim, and recognize Jerusalem and the resurrection of the dead." (Stern 2018, p. 105)) All Samaritans in both Holon and Kiryat Luza have Israeli citizenship, but those in Kiryat Luza also hold Palestinian citizenship; the latter group are not subject to mandatory conscription.

== Etymology and terminology ==
Inscriptions from the Samaritan diaspora in Delos, dating as early as 150–50 BCE, provide the "oldest known self-designation" for Samaritans, indicating that they called themselves Bene Israel (lit. 'children of Israel') in Hebrew (i.e., the literal descendants of the biblical prophet Israel, also known as Jacob, more commonly "Israelites").

In their own language, Samaritan Hebrew, the Samaritans call themselves "Israel", "B'nai Israel", and, alternatively, "Shamerim" (שַמֶרִים, 'Guardians', 'Keepers', or 'Watchers'). They call themselves al-Sāmiriyyūn (السامريون) in Arabic. The term is cognate with the Biblical Hebrew term Šomerim, and both terms reflect a Semitic root שמר, which means "to watch" or "to guard".

Historically, Samaritans were concentrated in Samaria. In Modern Hebrew, the Samaritans are called Shomronim (שומרונים, 'Samaritans'), which means "inhabitants of Samaria". In modern English, Samaritans refer to themselves as "Israelite Samaritans". (Note: "Since they attach great importance to their identity as the true Israelites, they added a note that their self-identification is not 'Samaritans', but 'Israelites whose center of life is Mt. Gerizim'. Generally, they call themselves 'Israelite Samaritans'."(Pummer 2016, p. 2))

That the meaning of their name signifies "Guardians" (or 'Keepers' or 'Watchers') "of the Law" (Samaritan Pentateuch), rather than being a toponym referring to the inhabitants of the region of Samaria, was remarked on by a number of Christian Church Fathers, including Epiphanius of Salamis in the Panarion; Jerome and Eusebius in the Chronicon; and Origen in The Commentary on Saint John's Gospel. The historian Josephus uses several terms for the Samaritans, which he appears to use interchangeably. (Note: Samareis Σαμαρεῖς (49 times); Samar(e)itai Σαμαρ(ε)ιται (18); Sikimitai Σικιμῖται (17 times); Hebraioi Ἑβραῖοι and Khouthaoi Χουθαοι (8 times). The form Σαμαρεῖται was the term favoured in the Persian period, but scribes transmitting Josephus's works used the forms interchangeably (Kartveit 2009, pp. 71–79, 71–73).) Among them is a reference to Khuthaioi, a designation employed to denote peoples in Media and Persia putatively sent to Samaria to replace the exiled Israelite population. (Note: "Once Salmanasses had then deported the Israelites, he settled in their place the nation of Chouthaites (τὸ τϖν Χουθαίων ἔθνος), who previously were in the interior of Persia and Media. Thereafter, however, they were called the Samareians (Σαμαρεῖς) getting this name from the country in which they were settled. Josephus, Antiquities of the Jews 10:184." (Kartveit 2009, p. 74)) (Note: "(The Chouthaioi brought to Samaria their own gods and worshipped them and thereby) provoked the Most High God to anger and wrath. ... And so they sent some elders to the king of the Assyrians and asked him to send priests.. and after being instructed in the laws and worship of this God, they worshipped him with great zeal. ... They continue to practice these same customs even to this day, those who are called Chouthaioi in the Hebrew language, and Samareitai (Σαμαρείται) in the Greek; those who alternatively (πρὸς μεταβολὴν) call themselves their relatives whenever they see things going well for the Jews, as if they were descendants of Joseph and had family ties with them in virtue of that origin; when, however, they see that things are going badly for them (i.e., for the Jews), they say that they are not at all close to them and that they have no claim to their loyalty or race; instead they make themselves out to be migrants of another nation(μετοίκους ἀλλοεθνεῖς)." Josephus, Antiquities of the Jews 9.288-291 (Kartveit 2009, p. 74).) These Khouthaioi were, in fact, Hellenistic Phoenicians/Sidonians. Samareis (Ancient Greek: Σαμαρεῖς) may refer to inhabitants of the region of Samaria, or of the city of that name, though some texts use it to refer specifically to Samaritans. (Note: Joseph also uses the term "those of Gerizim" (τϖν ἐν Γαριζείν) Antiquities of the Jews 12:7 (Kartveit 2009, p. 72).)

== Origins ==
The origins of the Samaritans have long been disputed between their own tradition and that of the Jews. Ancestrally, Samaritans affirm that they descend from the tribes of Ephraim and Manasseh in ancient Samaria. Samaritan tradition associates the split between them and the Judean-led southern Israelites to the time of the biblical priest Eli, described as a "false" high priest who usurped the priestly office from its occupant, Uzzi, and established a rival shrine at Shiloh, thereby preventing southern pilgrims from Judah and the territory of Benjamin from attending the shrine at Gerizim. Eli is also held to have created a duplicate of the Ark of the Covenant, which eventually made its way to the Judahite sanctuary in Jerusalem. (Note: Shlomo Hofman paraphrases their traditional view as follows: "Until that time, the Ark of the Covenant had been kept at the sanctuary of YHWH on Mt. Gerizim. According to this tradition, the priest Eli was prevented from rising to the high priesthood because he was of the family of Itamar, not the high priestly family of Eleazar. Nevertheless, he took the Ark of the Covenant from Mt. Gerizim to Shiloh and established a rival cult there. As a result of this, two centers of the priesthood arose. One center was on Mt. Gerizim, at whose head stood the legitimate high priest, Uzzi (a descendant of Phineas and of the family Eleazar). The second (heretical) priesthood was at Shiloh, and the priest Eli, a descendant of Itamar, was at its head." (Hofman 2007, p. 719))

In contrast, Orthodox Jewish tradition—based on material found in the Hebrew Bible, Josephus's work, the Talmud, and other historiographic sources—dates their presence much later, to the beginning of the Babylonian captivity. In Rabbinic Judaism (e.g., in Tosefta Berakhot), Samaritans are called Cuthites or Cutheans (כותים, Kutim), referring to the ancient city of Kutha, geographically located in what is today Iraq. Josephus, in both the Wars of the Jews and the Antiquities of the Jews, writing of the destruction of the temple on Mount Gerizim by John Hyrcanus, also refers to the Samaritans as the Cuthaeans. (Note: Josephus, Wars of the Jews 1:62; Antiquities of the Jews 13:154–256 (Pummer 2009, pp. 200–210).) In the biblical account, however, Kuthah was one of several cities from which people were brought to Samaria. (Note: "The settlement upheaval and destruction of the Northern Kingdom occurred in the late eighth century BCE, followed by the Assyrian resettlement of peoples brought from neighbouring lands. Presumably these peoples joined the remnant that was left in Samaria. These fateful historical events hardly left any traces in the material culture of Samaria. ... (Challenging Adam Zertal's use of Cuthean for this period, Magen continues) Cuth was one of several cities from which various peoples were brought to Samaria (2 Kings 17:24). To spite the Samaritans, the Sages dubbed them 'Cutheans'," (Magen 2007, p. 177 and n.3))

The similarities between Samaritans and Jews were such that the rabbis of the Mishnah found it impossible to draw a clear distinction between the two groups. Attempts to date when the schism among Israelites took place—which engendered the division between Samaritans and Judaeans—vary greatly, from the time of Ezra down to the siege of Jerusalem (70 CE) and the Bar Kokhba revolt (132–136 CE). The emergence of a distinctive Samaritan identity, the outcome of a mutual estrangement between them and Jews, was something that developed over several centuries. Generally, a decisive rupture is believed to have taken place in the Hasmonean period.

=== Samaritan version ===
The Samaritan traditions of their history are contained in the Kitab al-Ta'rikh compiled by Abu'l-Fath in 1355. According to this, a civil war erupted among the Israelites when Eli, son of Yafni, the treasurer of the sons of Israel, sought to usurp the High Priesthood of Israel from the heirs of Phinehas. Gathering disciples and binding them by an oath of loyalty, he sacrificed on the stone altar without using salt, a rite which made High Priest Ozzi rebuke and disown him. Eli and his acolytes revolted and shifted to Shiloh, where he built an alternative temple and an altar, a replica of the original on Mount Gerizim. Eli's sons Hophni and Phinehas had intercourse with women and feasted on the meat of the sacrifice inside the Tabernacle. Thereafter, Israel was split into three factions: the original Mount Gerizim community of loyalists, the breakaway group under Eli, and heretics worshipping idols associated with Hophni and Phinehas. Judaism emerged later with those who followed the example of Eli. (Note: "A terrible civil war broke out between Eli son of Yafni, of the line of Ithamar, and the sons of Pincus (Phinehas), because Eli son of Yafni resolved to usurp the High Priesthood from the descendants of Pincus. He used to offer sacrifices on an altar of stones. He was 50 years old, endowed with wealth and in charge of the treasury of the Children of Israel. ...He offered a sacrifice on the altar, but without salt, as if he were inattentive. When the Great High Priest Ozzi learned of this, and found the sacrifice was not accepted, he thoroughly disowned him; and it is (even) said that he rebuked him. Thereupon he and the group that sympathized with him, rose in revolt and at once he and his followers and his beasts set off for Shiloh. Thus, Israel split in factions. He sent to their leaders saying to them, 'Anyone who would like to see wonderful things, let him come to me.' Then he assembled a large group around him in Shiloh, and built a Temple for himself there; he constructed a place like the Temple (on Mount Gerizim). He built an altar, omitting no detail—it all corresponded to the original, piece by piece. At this time the Children of Israel split into three factions. A loyal faction on Mount Gerizim; a heretical faction that followed false gods; and the faction that followed Eli son of Yafni in Shiloh." (Anderson & Giles 2001, pp. 11–12))

Mount Gerizim was the original Holy Place of the Israelites from the time that Joshua conquered Canaan and the tribes of Israel settled the land. The reference to Mount Gerizim derives from the biblical story of Moses ordering Joshua to take the Twelve Tribes of Israel to the mountains by Shechem (Nablus) and place half of the tribes, six in number, on Mount Gerizim—the Mount of the Blessing—and the other half on Mount Ebal—the Mount of the Curse.

=== Biblical versions ===
According to the Hebrew Bible, they were temporarily united under a United Monarchy, but after the death of King Solomon, the kingdom split in two, the northern Kingdom of Israel with its last capital city Samaria and the southern Kingdom of Judah with its capital Jerusalem. The Deuteronomistic history, written in Judah, portrays Israel as a sinful kingdom, divinely punished for its idolatry and iniquity, and destroyed by the Neo-Assyrian Empire in 720 BCE. The tensions continued in the post-exilic period. The Books of Kings is more inclusive than Ezra–Nehemiah because the ideal is of one Israel with twelve tribes, whereas the Books of Chronicles concentrate on the Kingdom of Judah and ignore the Kingdom of Israel. Accounts of Samaritan origins in 2 Kings 17:6,24 and Chronicles, together with statements in both Ezra and Nehemiah, differ in important degrees, suppressing or highlighting narrative details according to the various intentions of their authors. (Note: "The author of Chronicles conceals the information that is given prominence in Kings, and vice versa. [...] The books of Ezra and Nehemiah adopt a narrow sectarian approach that seeks to maintain the uniqueness and racial purity of the exiles in Babylonia, while Chronicles is more broad-minded and views the Israelite nation as a great people that includes all the tribes, both Judah and Israel." (Magen 2007, p. 187))

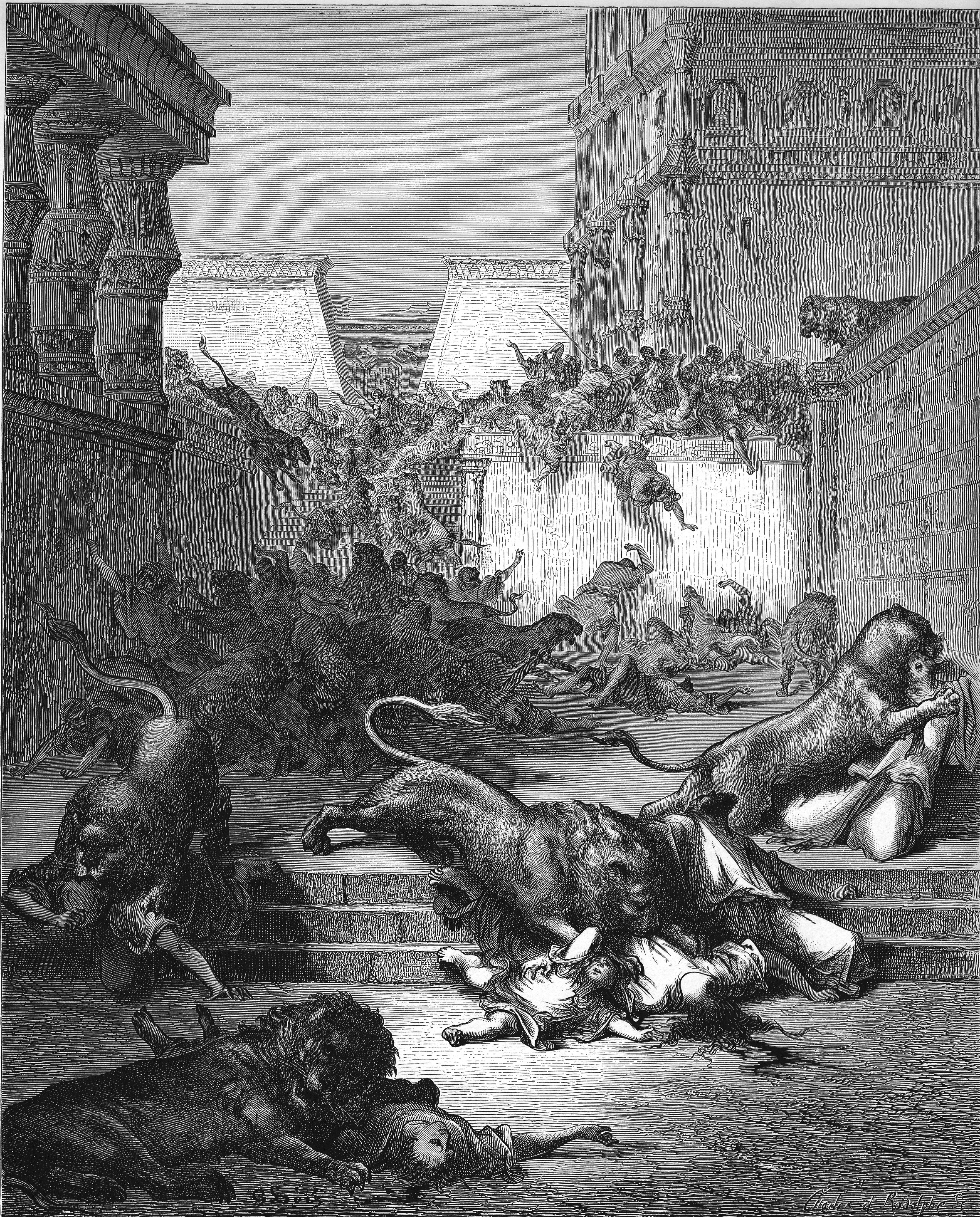
Foreigners eaten by lions in Samaria, illustration by Gustave Doré from the 1866 La Sainte Bible, The Holy Bible

The narratives in Genesis about the rivalries among the 12 sons of Jacob, and other stories of brotherly discord, are viewed by historian Diklah Zohar as describing tensions between north and south, always resolving them in a symbolically favourable way for the Kingdom of Judah rather than Israel.

The emergence of the Samaritans as an ethnic and religious community distinct from other Levant peoples appears to have occurred at some point after the Assyrian conquest of the Kingdom of Israel in approximately 721 BCE. The annals of Sargon II of Assyria indicate that he deported 27,290 inhabitants of the former kingdom. Jewish tradition affirms the Assyrian deportations and replacement of the previous inhabitants by forced resettlement by other peoples, but claims a different ethnic origin for the Samaritans. The Talmud mentions a people called "Cuthim" on several occasions, referring to their arrival at the hands of the Assyrians. According to 2 Kings 17:6, 24 and Josephus, the people of Israel were removed by the king of the Assyrians (Sargon II) to Halah, to Gozan on the Khabur River and to the towns of the Medes. The king of the Assyrians then brought people from Babylon, Kutha, Avva, Hamath and Sepharvaim to place in Samaria. Because God sent lions among them to kill them, the king of the Assyrians sent one of the priests from Bethel to teach the new settlers about God's ordinances. The result was that the new settlers worshipped both the God of the land and the gods of the countries they came from.

In the Chronicles, following Samaria's destruction, King Hezekiah is depicted as endeavouring to draw the Ephraimites, Zebulonites, Asherites and Manassites closer to Judah. Temple repairs at the time of Josiah were financed by money from all "the remnant of Israel" in Samaria, including from Manasseh, Ephraim, and Benjamin. Jeremiah likewise speaks of people from Shechem, Shiloh, and Samaria who brought offerings of frankincense and grain to the House of YHWH. Chronicles makes no mention of an Assyrian resettlement. Yitzakh Magen argues that the version of Chronicles is perhaps closer to the historical truth and that the Assyrian settlement was unsuccessful; he asserts that a notable Israelite population remained in Samaria, part of which (following the conquest of Judah) fled south and settled there as refugees. Adam Zertal dates the Assyrian onslaught at 721 BCE to 647 BCE. From a pottery type he identifies as Mesopotamian clustering around the Menasheh lands of Samaria, he infers that there were three waves of imported settlers. Furthermore, to this day, the Samaritans claim descent from the tribe of Joseph. (Note: "The laymen also possess their traditional claims. They are all of the tribe of Joseph, except those of the tribe of Benjamin, but this traditional branch of people, which, the Chronicles assert, was established at Gaza in earlier days, seems to have disappeared. There exists an aristocratic feeling amongst the different families in this community, and some are very proud over their pedigree and the great men it had produced." (Montgomery 2006, p. 32))

The Encyclopaedia Judaica (under "Samaritans") summarizes both past and present views on the Samaritans' origins. It says:

Until the middle of the 20th century it was customary to believe that the Samaritans originated from a mixture of the people living in Samaria and other peoples at the time of the conquest of Samaria by Assyria (722–721 BCE). The biblical account in II Kings 17 had long been the decisive source for the formulation of historical accounts of Samaritan origins. Reconsideration of this passage, however, has led to more attention being paid to the Chronicles of the Samaritans themselves. With the publication of Chronicle II (Sefer ha-Yamim), the fullest Samaritan version of their own history became available: the chronicles, and a variety of non-Samaritan materials.

According to the former, the Samaritans are the direct descendants of the Joseph tribes, Ephraim and Manasseh. Until the 17th century CE, they possessed a high priesthood descending directly from Aaron through Eleazar and Phinehas. They claim to have continuously occupied their ancient territory and to have been at peace with other Israelite tribes until the time when Eli disrupted the Northern cult by moving from Shechem to Shiloh and attracting some northern Israelites to his new followers there. For the Samaritans, this was the "schism" par excellence.

— "Samaritans" in Encyclopaedia Judaica, 1972, Volume 14, col. 727.

In the New Testament, while in discussion with a Samaritan woman, Jesus is reported to have made a clear distinction between Samaritans and Jews:

You Samaritans don't really know the one you worship. But we Jews do know the God we worship, and by using us, God will save the world.

— John 4:22 (Contemporary English Version)

=== Josephus's version ===
Josephus, a key source, has long been considered a prejudiced witness hostile to the Samaritans. (Note: "if one considers the general framework, the Samaritans are used by Josephus as a group that forms a negative counterpart to the loyal Jews, an example of people who try to exploit the ruling powers and who are justly punished for that." (Kartveit 2009, p. 72); "For many centuries, more precisely since the days of Flavius Josephus the account in 2 Kings 17:24–41 was accepted as accurate description of the origin of the Samaritans. They were seen as descendants of pagan colonist converts from Cutha in Persia, and were therefore called 'Cutheans' However, recent research has shown that this tradition was the result of polemics against the Samaritans, and cannot be accepted as historical."(Pummer 1997, p. 118)) He displays an ambiguous attitude, calling them both a distinct, opportunistic ethnos and, alternatively, a Jewish sect.

=== Dead Sea scrolls ===
The Dead Sea scrolls' proto-Esther fragment 4Q550^{c} has an obscure phrase about the possibility of a Kutha(ean)(Kuti) man returning but the reference remains obscure. 4Q372 records hopes that the northern tribes will return to the land of Joseph. The current dwellers in the north are referred to as fools, an enemy people. However, they are not referred to as foreigners. It goes on to say that the Samaritans mocked Jerusalem and built a temple on a high place to provoke Israel.

=== Modern scholarship ===
Contemporary scholarship holds that deportations occurred both before and after the Assyrian conquest of the Kingdom of Israel in 722–720 BCE, with varying impacts across Galilee, Transjordan, and Samaria. During the earlier Assyrian invasions, Galilee and Transjordan experienced significant deportations, with entire tribes vanishing; the tribes of Reuben, Gad, Dan, and Naphtali are never again mentioned. Archaeological evidence from these regions shows that a large depopulation process took place there in the late 8th century BCE, with numerous sites being destroyed, abandoned, or showing a long occupation gap. In contrast, some scholars argue that Samaria—a larger and more populated area—presents a more mixed picture. While some sites were destroyed or abandoned during the Assyrian invasion, major cities such as Samaria and Megiddo remained largely intact, and other sites show continuity of occupation. Other scholars argue that archaeological findings from Samaria show that the territory as a whole—except for a few small areas—was devastated following the Assyrian conquest.

Alongside these deportations, the Assyrians settled exiles from Babylonia, Elam, and Syria in places including Gezer, Hadid, and villages north of Shechem and Tirzah. Two 7th-century cuneiform legal tables from Tel Hadid contain predominantly non-local names, including Akkadian ones, and have been interpreted as evidence for a community that included Mesopotamian deportees. Further evidence may be provided by distinctive wedge-impressed bowls found mainly at small rural sites in southern Samaria, dating from the 7th and 6th centuries BCE; they were produced locally, but their characteristic impressions have Mesopotamian parallels. Archaeological surveys also indicate a reorganization of settlement in the area under the Assyrians, comprising both newly established settlements and sites that continued from the Israelite period. Nevertheless, even if the Assyrians deported 30,000 people, as they claimed, many would have remained in the area. Based on changes in material culture, Adam Zertal estimated that only 10% of the Israelite population in Samaria was deported, while the number of imported settlers was likely no more than a few thousand, indicating that most Israelites continued to reside in Samaria. Gary N. Knoppers similarly described the demographic shift in Samaria as "not the wholesale replacement of one local population by a foreign population, but rather the diminution of the local population," which he attributed to deaths from war, disease, and starvation, forced deportations, and migrations to other regions, particularly south to the Kingdom of Judah; the state-sponsored immigrants forcibly brought into Samaria appear to have generally assimilated into the local population. Archaeologist Eric Cline takes an intermediate view, estimating that only 10–20% of the Israelite population (roughly 40,000 people) were deported to Assyria in 720 BCE, that about 80,000 fled to Judah, and that between 100,000 and 230,000 remained in Samaria, where they intermarried with the foreign settlers to form the Samaritans.

Nevertheless, the Book of Chronicles records that King Hezekiah of Judah invited members of the tribes of Ephraim, Zebulun, Asher, Issachar and Manasseh to Jerusalem to celebrate Passover after the destruction of Israel. In light of this, it has been suggested that the bulk of those who survived the Assyrian invasions remained in the region. Per this interpretation, the Samaritan community of today is thought to be predominantly descended from those who remained. Biblical scholar Shemaryahu Talmon has supported the Samaritan tradition that they are mainly descended from the tribes of Ephraim and Manasseh who remained in Israel after the Assyrian conquest, arguing that the description of them at 2 Kings 17:24 as foreigners is tendentious and intended to ostracize the Samaritans from those Israelites who returned from the Babylonian exile in 520 BCE, and that 2 Chronicles 30:1 could be read as confirming that a large fraction of the tribes of Ephraim and Manasseh (i.e., Samaritans) remained in Israel after the Assyrian exile. Classicist historian E. Mary Smallwood wrote that the Samaritans "were the survivors of the pre-Exilic northern kingdom of Israel, diluted by intermarriage with alien settlers," and that they broke away from mainstream Judaism in the 4th century BCE.

Beyond questions of descent, the religious identity of this remnant community is also debated. Magnar Kartveit argues that the people who later became known as Samaritans likely had diverse origins and lived in Samaria and other areas, and that it was the temple project on Mount Gerizim that provided the unifying characteristic allowing them to be identified as Samaritans. The religion of this remnant community is likely distorted by the account in the Books of Kings, which claims that the local Israelite religion was corrupted by the introduction of foreign customs by Assyrian colonists. Some scholars argue that the surviving Samaritans in fact continued to practice Yahwism, which would explain why they did not resist Judahite kings such as Hezekiah and Josiah in imposing their religious reforms in Samaria.

Modern genetic studies support the Samaritan narrative that they descend from indigenous Israelites. Shen et al. (2004) formerly speculated that outmarriage with foreign women may have taken place. Most recently, the same group came up with genetic evidence that Samaritans are closely linked to Cohanim, and therefore can be traced back to an Israelite population prior to the Assyrian invasion. This correlates with expectations from the fact that the Samaritans retained endogamous and biblical patrilineal marriage customs, and that they remained a genetically isolated population.

== History ==
=== Persian period ===
According to Chronicles 36:22–23, the Persian emperor Cyrus the Great (reigned 559–530 BCE) permits the return of the exiles to their homeland and orders the rebuilding of the Temple (Zion). The prophet Isaiah identifies Cyrus as "the LORD's Messiah". As the Babylonian captivity had primarily affected the lowlands of Judea, the Samarian populations had likely avoided the casualties of the crisis of exile and in fact showed signs of widespread prosperity.

The books of Ezra–Nehemiah detail a lengthy political struggle between Nehemiah, governor of the new Persian province of Yehud Medinata, and Sanballat the Horonite, the governor of Samaria, centered around the refortification of the destroyed Jerusalem. Despite this political discourse, the text implies that relationships between the Jews and Samaritans were otherwise quite amicable, as intermarriage between the two seems commonplace, even to the point that the High Priest Joiada married Sanballat's daughter. Some theologians believe Nehemiah 11:3 describes other Israelite tribes returning to Judah with the Judeans. The former lived in the cities of Judah, whilst the latter lived in Jerusalem. Benjamites also lived with Judeans in Jerusalem.

During Achaemenid rule, material evidence suggests significant overlap between Jews and proto-Samaritans, with the two groups sharing a common language and script, eschewing the claim that the schism had taken form by this time. However, onomastic evidence suggests the existence of a distinct northern culture. Some inhabitants of Samaria during this period identified with Israelite heritage. This connection is evidenced in two ways: first, through biblical accounts of local officials' involvement with the Jerusalem Temple, and second, through naming patterns. Many names recorded in the Wadi Daliyeh documents and on Samaritan coins feature Israelite elements. Sanballat's sons bore the theophoric Israelite names Delaiah and Shelemiah, while the name "Jeroboam", used by northern Israelite kings during the monarchic period, also appears on Samaritan coins.

The archaeological evidence can find no sign of habitation in the Assyrian and Babylonian periods at Mount Gerizim but indicates the existence of a sacred precinct on the site in the Persian period by the 5th century BCE. This is not to be interpreted as signaling a precipitous schism between the Jews and Samaritans, as the Gerizim temple was not the only Yahwistic temple outside of Judea. According to most modern scholars, the split between the Jews and Samaritans was a gradual historical process extending over several centuries rather than a single schism at a given point in time.

=== Hellenistic period ===
==== Foreign rule ====
The Macedonian Empire conquered the Levant in the 330s BCE, resulting in both Samaria and Judea coming under Greek rule as the province of Coele-Syria. Samaria was by-and-large devastated by the Macedonian conquest and subsequent colonization efforts, though its southern lands were spared the broader consequences of the invasion and continued to thrive. Matters were further complicated in 331 BCE when the Samaritans rose up in rebellion and murdered the Macedonian-appointed prefect Andromachus, resulting in a brutal reprisal by the army. Following the death of Alexander the Great, the area initially became part of the Ptolemaic Kingdom, but was eventually conquered by the neighboring Seleucid Empire.

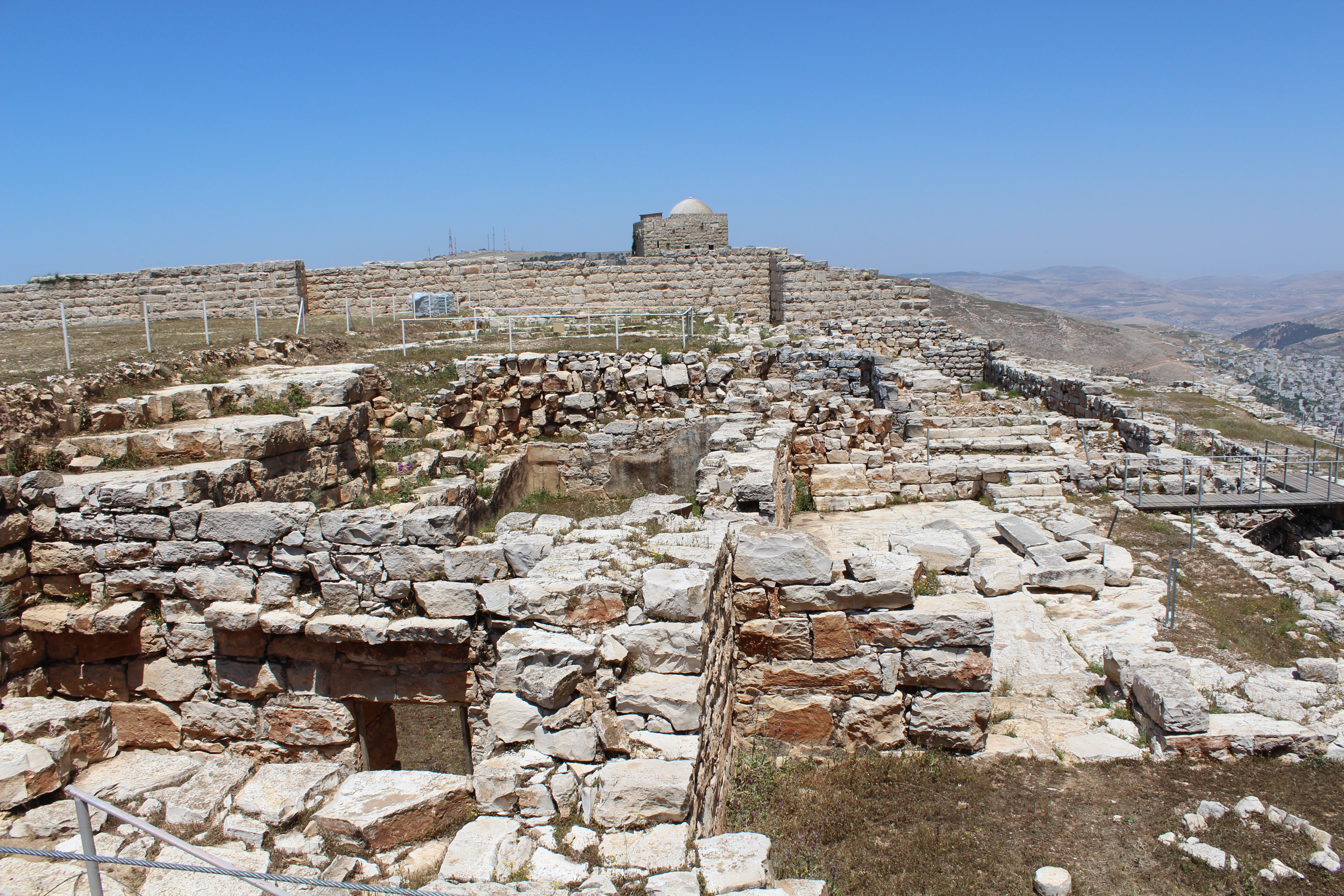
Ruins of the Hellenistic-era Samaritan settlement on Mount Gerizim, built next to the Samaritan Temple and destroyed c. 110 BCE

Though the temple on Mount Gerizim had existed since the 5th century BCE, evidence shows that its sacred precinct experienced an extravagant expansion during the early Hellenistic era, indicating its status as the preeminent place of Samaritan worship had begun to crystallize. By the time of Antiochus III the Great, the temple "town" had reached 30 dunams in size. The presence of a flourishing cult centered around Gerizim is documented by the sudden resurgence of Yahwistic and Hebrew names in contemporary correspondence, suggesting that the Samaritan community had officially been established by the 2nd century BCE. Overall, the Samaritans were generally more populous and wealthier than the Judeans in Palestine, until 164 BC.

==== Antiochus IV Epiphanes and Hellenization ====
Antiochus IV Epiphanes was on the throne of the Seleucid Empire from 175 to 163 BCE. His policy was to Hellenize his entire kingdom and standardize religious observance. According to 1 Maccabees 1:41-50 he proclaimed himself the incarnation of the Greek god Zeus and mandated death to anyone who refused to worship him. In the 2nd century BCE, a series of events led to a revolution by a faction of Judeans against Antiochus IV.

Anderson notes that during the reign of Antiochus IV:

the Samaritan temple was renamed either Zeus Hellenios (willingly by the Samaritans according to Josephus) or, more likely, Zeus Xenios, (unwillingly in accord with 2 Macc. 6:2).

— Bromiley, 4.304

Josephus quotes the Samaritans as saying:

We therefore beseech thee, our benefactor and saviour, to give order to Apollonius, the governor of this part of the country, and to Nicanor, the procurator of thy affairs, to give us no disturbances, nor to lay to our charge what the Jews are accused for, since we are aliens from their nation and from their customs, but let our temple which at present hath no name at all, be named the Temple of Jupiter Hellenius.

— Josephus 12:5

In the letter, defended as genuine by E. Bickerman and M. Stern, the Samaritans assert their distinction from the Judeans based on both race (γένος) and in customs (ἔθος).

According to II Maccabees:

Shortly afterwards, the Greek king sent Gerontes the Athenian to force the Jews of Israel to violate their ancestral customs and live no longer by the laws of God; and to profane the Temple in Jerusalem and dedicate it to Olympian Zeus, and the one on Mount Gerizim to Zeus, Patron of Strangers, as the inhabitants of the latter place had requested.

— II Maccabees 6:1–2

==== Destruction of the temple ====
During the Hellenistic period, Samaria was largely divided between a Hellenizing faction based in Samaria (Sebastia) and a pious faction in Shechem and surrounding rural areas, led by the High Priest. Samaria was a largely autonomous state nominally dependent on the Seleucid Empire until around 110 BCE, (Note: Josephus sets the date for the destruction at 128 BCE. Israeli archaeology has established that the destruction levels are compatible only with a later date, around 110 BCE (Kartveit 2009, p. 193).) when the Hasmonean ruler John Hyrcanus destroyed the Samaritan temple on Mount Gerizim and devastated Samaria. Only a few stone remnants of the temple exist today.

Hyrcanus' campaign of destruction was the watershed moment which confirmed hostile relations between Jews and Samaritans. The actions of the Hasmonean dynasty resulted in widespread Samaritan resentment of, and alienation from, their Judean brethren, resulting in the deterioration of relations between the two that lasted centuries, if not millennia.

=== Diaspora ===
During the Hellenistic period, a Samaritan Diaspora is documented outside Samaria. Among the earlier instances is Ergasion the Samaritan, who is attested as a member of a pagan group in Athens, Greece, during the 4th to 3rd century BC. Whether he was declaring his faith, ethnicity, or both remains unclear. In the late Hellenistic period, a Samaritan family erected an inscription at Caunos, in Caria, a region of Asia Minor. The father, Simon, is identified as coming from Shechem, while the rest of the family bear Greek names, such as Dionysia and Cleopatra.

=== Roman period ===
Under the Roman Empire, Samaria became a part of the Herodian Tetrarchy, and with the deposition of Herod Archelaus in the early 1st century CE, Samaria became a part of the province of Judaea. Samaritans appear briefly in the Christian gospels, most notably in the account of the Samaritan woman at the well and the parable of the Good Samaritan. In the former, it is noted that a substantial number of Samaritans accepted Jesus through the woman's testimony to them, and Jesus stayed in Samaria for two days before returning to Cana. In the latter, it is only the Samaritan who helps the man stripped of clothing, beaten, and left on the road half dead, his Abrahamic covenantal circumcision implicitly evident. A priest and a Levite walk past, but the Samaritan helps the naked man regardless of his nakedness (itself religiously offensive to the priest and Levite), his self-evident poverty, or to which Hebrew sect he belongs.

During the First Jewish–Roman War in 67 CE a significant Samaritan uprising gathered on Mt. Gerizim. In response, Roman general Vespasian dispatched a relatively small force under the command of Cerialis. Although some Samaritans surrendered, most fought, resulting in heavy casualties. According to Josephus, 11,600 Samaritans were killed. There is no evidence of Samaritan involvement in later phases of the revolt. In 72/73 CE, Vespasian established Flavia Neapolis on the site of Mabartha, near Shechem. While some scholars argue this was to counter Samaritan influence and aspirations, others contend it was primarily a geo-strategic decision. The new city was designed as a polis and included both Samaritan and pagan populations, becoming a major urban center for the Samaritans. Despite its Hellenistic character, the city maintained local traditions, as reflected in its coins which avoided pagan symbols. In the post-revolt period, two Samaritans appear among what are likely refugee epitaphs in Athens: Ammia the Samaritan and Theodora the Samaritan. A generation later, in 100 CE, a man named Praulus of Samaria made a dedication at the Serapeion on Delos.

The possibility of Samaritan involvement in the Bar Kokhba revolt (132–136 CE) alongside the Jews against the Romans remains uncertain. Some Jewish sources, such as the Genesis Rabbah and the Jerusalem Talmud, depict the Samaritans as obstructing Jewish efforts, including the construction of the Temple and the defense of Betar, leading to interpretations of possible Samaritan collaboration with the Romans. However, these sources are considered legendary or anachronistic. Additionally, later Samaritan chronicles referring to the Hadrianic period do not connect events from this time to the Bar Kokhba revolt. Consequently, Mor concludes that there is no concrete evidence of cooperation between Jews and Samaritans during the revolt.

The defeat of the Jews in the Bar Kokhba revolt, along with the depopulation and destruction of Judea, allowed the Samaritans to expand into former Jewish areas, particularly in northern Judea, establishing themselves in places such as Emmaus and Sha'alavim. Samaritans also settled in the Beit She'an Valley and in coastal cities like Caesarea. In the ensuing years, the synagogue gained prominence as the central religious institution for the Samaritan community. According to later Samaritan chronicles, synagogues faced episodes of suppression during the second and third centuries CE. Under Commodus (180–192 CE) they were said to have been closed, and during the reign of an emperor called Alexander, identified either as Caracalla (211–217 CE) or Severus Alexander (222–235 CE), synagogues were reported to have been destroyed.

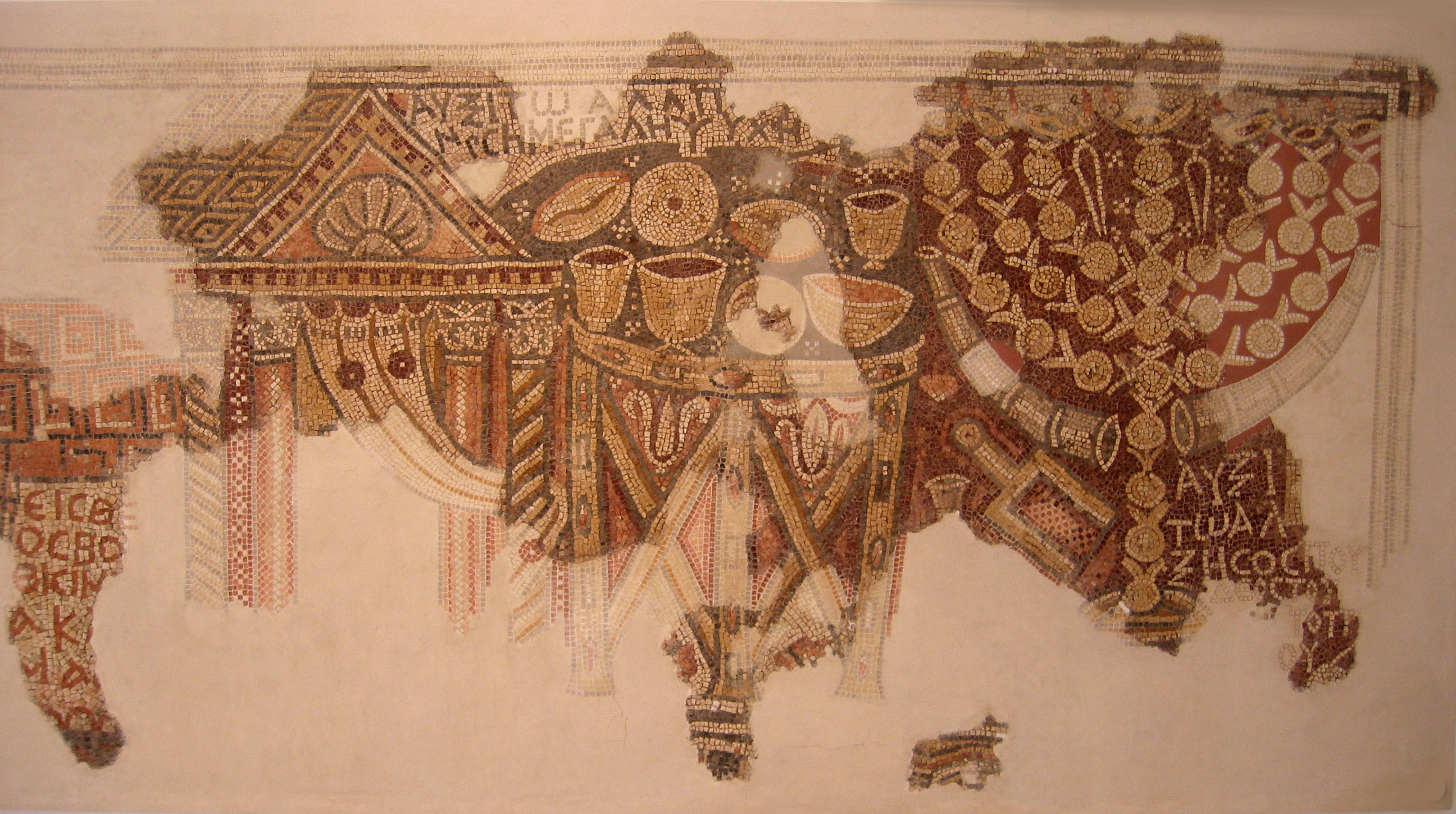
Central panel of the mosaic floor from the 4th-century El-Khirbe synagogue, now displayed in the Good Samaritan Museum

The 4th century witnessed a Samaritan cultural revival, marked by the development of a distinct Samaritan alphabet derived from the ancient Paleo-Hebrew script, as well as the composition of new religious works. During this period, much of the liturgy was organized and formalized under the high priest Baba Rabba. Later Samaritan chronicles also credit him with the construction of synagogues in several villages, including Awarta, Salem, Namara, Qaryat Haja, Qarawa, Tira Luza, Dabarin, and Beit Jan. Samaritan chronicles also report that the high priest 'Aqbun, possibly during the reign of Emperor Valens (364–378/9 CE), rebuilt the synagogue in Nablus, which later sources say was confiscated under the Byzantines and again following the Muslim conquest.

Archaeological and literary evidence indicates that by late antiquity, Samaritans established diaspora communities across the Mediterranean. In Asia Minor, Palladius recorded a Samaritan synagogue in Tarsus around 407/408 CE, while a bilingual Samaritan-Greek inscription from Thessaloniki, dated to the 4th–6th centuries CE, points to organized communal life there. In Rome, a letter of King Theoderic the Great (early 6th century) refers to a Samaritan synagogue. In Sicily, Pope Gregory I's correspondence attests to Samaritans in Syracuse at the end of the 6th century, complementing epigraphic evidence of a synagogue there from the 3rd–4th century CE.

=== Byzantine period ===
According to Samaritan sources, the Eastern Roman emperor Zeno (r. 474–491), whom they refer to as "Zait the King of Edom," persecuted the Samaritans. He is said to have travelled to Neapolis (Shechem), summoned the elders, and demanded their conversion to Christianity. When they refused, many were killed, and the local synagogue was rebuilt as a church. Zeno also appropriated Mount Gerizim, where he constructed several buildings, including a tomb for his recently deceased son. A cross was placed on the tomb so that Samaritans, in bowing before God, would also bow before it. By 484 the Samaritans rose in revolt. They attacked Neapolis, burning five churches erected on former Samaritan holy sites and mutilating Bishop Terebinthus, who was officiating at Pentecost. The rebels elected Justa (also rendered Justasa or Justasus) as their king and moved to Caesarea, where a noteworthy Samaritan community lived. There, several Christians were killed and the church of Saint Sebastian was destroyed. Justa celebrated the victory with games in the circus. According to the Chronicon Paschale, the dux Palaestinae, Asclepiades, supported by the Caesarea-based Arcadiani of Rheges, defeated the rebels, killed Justa, and sent his head to Zeno. Procopius adds that Bishop Terebinthus appealed directly to Zeno for revenge, the emperor personally went to Samaria to quell the rebellion.

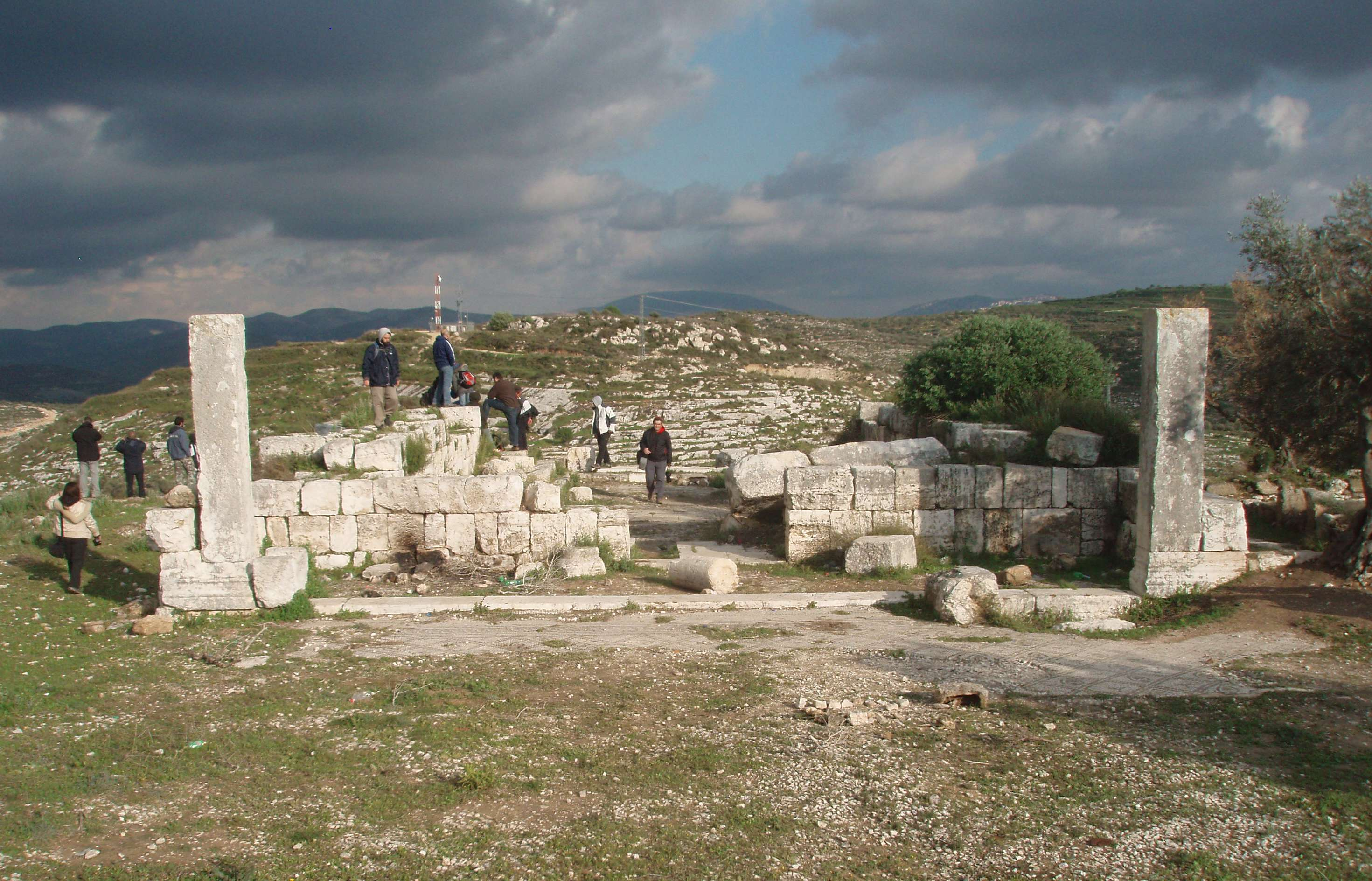
Ruins of the 4th-century Samaritan synagogue at Khirbet Samara, a settlement probably abandoned after the Samaritan revolts

Some modern historians believe that the order of the facts preserved by Samaritan sources should be inverted, with the persecution of Zeno as a consequence of the rebellion rather than its cause, and should have happened after 484, around 489. Zeno rebuilt the church of St. Procopius in Neapolis, and the Samaritans were banned from Mount Gerizim, on whose top a signaling tower was built to alert in case of civil unrest.

According to an anonymous biography of Mesopotamian monk Barsauma, whose pilgrimage to the region in the early 5th century was accompanied by clashes with locals and the forced conversion of non-Christians, Barsauma managed to convert Samaritans by conducting demonstrations of healing. Jacob, an ascetic healer living in a cave near Porphyrion, Mount Carmel in the 6th century CE, attracted admirers including Samaritans who later converted to Christianity. Under growing government pressure, many Samaritans who refused to convert to Christianity in the 6th century may have preferred paganism and even Manicheism.

Under a charismatic, messianic figure named Julianus ben Sabar (or ben Sahir), the Samaritans of Palaestina launched a war to create their own independent state in 529. With the help of the Ghassanids, Emperor Justinian I crushed the revolt; tens of thousands of Samaritans died or were enslaved. The Samaritan faith, which had previously enjoyed the status of religio licita, was virtually outlawed thereafter by the Christian Byzantine Empire; from a population once at least in the hundreds of thousands, the Samaritan community dwindled to tens of thousands.

The Byzantine response to the revolts, described by the archaeologist Claudine Dauphin as an act of ethnic cleansing, decimated five successive generations of the Samaritan population, destroyed their religious center, stripped their rights, and left them politically insignificant. Nevertheless, the Samaritan population in Samaria did survive. During a pilgrimage to the Holy Land in 570 CE, an anonymous Christian pilgrim from Piacenza travelled through Samaria and recorded the following: "From there we went up past a number of places belonging to Samaria and Judaea to the city of Sebaste, the resting-place of the Prophet Elisha. There were several Samaritan cities and villages on our way down through the plains, and wherever we passed along the streets they burned away our footprints with straw, whether we were Christians or Jews, they have such a horror of both". The same pilgrim also mentions a place called Castra Samaritanorum near Shikmona.

According to Menachem Mor, the decline of the Samaritan population between the 5th and 6th centuries was mostly due to the ongoing Christianization of Palestine's inhabitants, rather than the uprisings against the Byzantines. Mor argues that a large number of Samaritans in the cities and towns converted to Christianity, some under pressure and some of their own free will. He claims that both Samaritan and Christian sources preferred to conceal this phenomenon. The Samaritans preferred to attribute their numerical decrease on their resistance to coerced conversion, while the Christians were not willing to admit that the Samaritans were coerced into accepting Christianity and instead preferred to claim that many Samaritans were killed because of their rebellious nature. A change in the local population's identity throughout the Byzantine period is not indicated by the archeological findings.

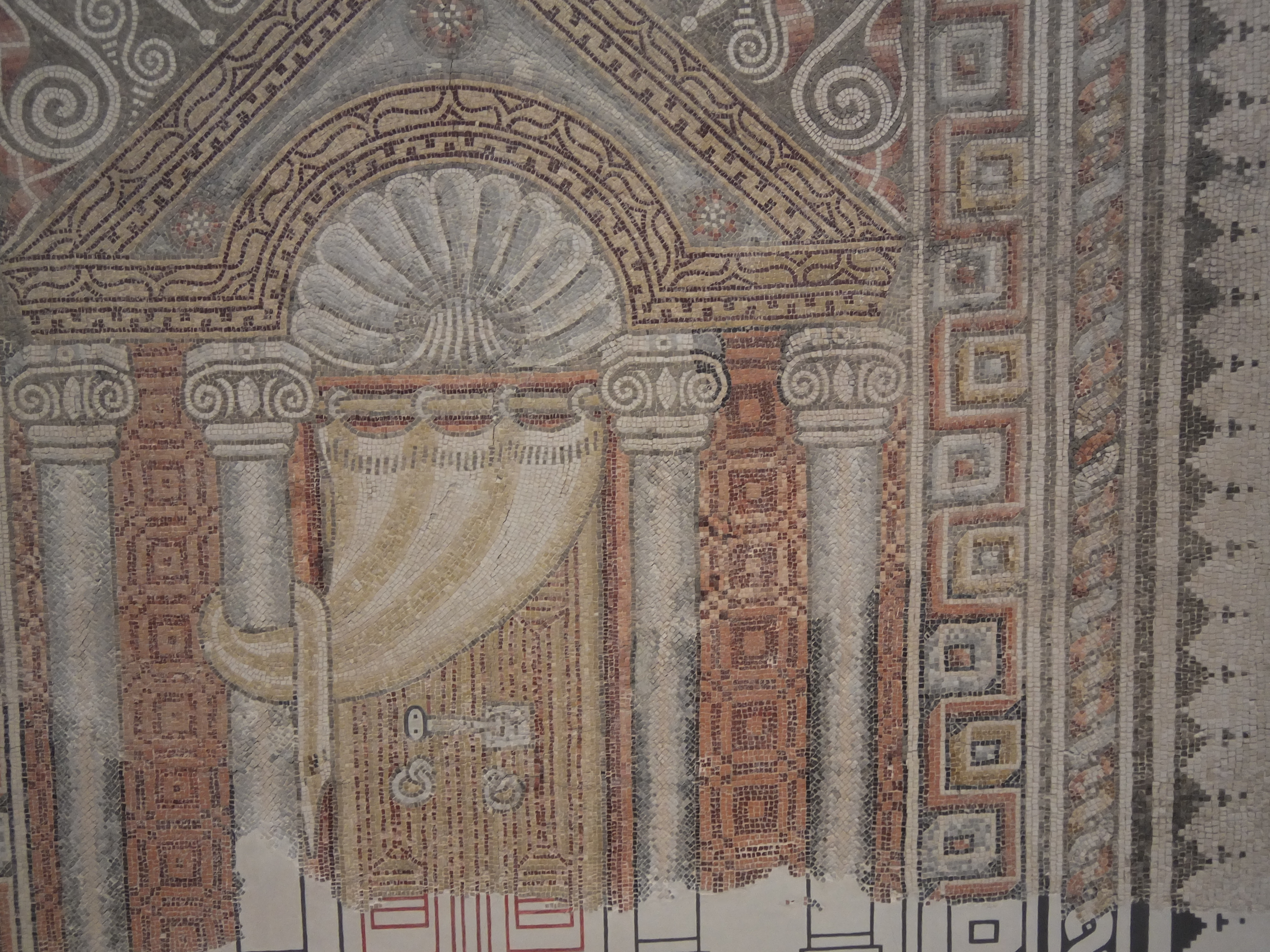
Mosaic from Samaritan synagogue (Israel Museum)

=== Early Islamic period ===
By the time of the Muslim conquest of the Levant, apart from Jund Filastin, small dispersed communities of Samaritans were living in Muslim Egypt, Syria, and Muslim Iran. According to Milka Levy-Rubin, many Samaritans were forced to convert under Abbasid and Tulunid rule (878–905 CE), having been subjected to hardships such as droughts, earthquakes, persecution by local governors, high taxes on religious minorities, and anarchy.

Like other non-Muslims in the empire, such as Jews, Samaritans were often considered to be People of the Book and were guaranteed religious freedom. Their minority status was protected by the Muslim rulers, and they had the right to practice their religion, but as dhimmi, adult males had to pay the jizya or "protection tax". This however changed during late Abbasid period, with increasing persecution targeting the Samaritan community and considering them infidels which must convert to Islam.

Anarchy overtook Palestine during the early years of Abbasid Caliph al-Ma'mun (813–833 CE), when his rule was challenged by internal strife. According to the Chronicle of Abu l-Fath, during this time, many clashes took place, the locals suffered from famine and even fled their homes out of fear, and "many left their faith". An exceptional case is of ibn Firāsa, a rebel who arrived in Palestine in 830 and was said to have loathed Samaritans and persecuted them. He punished them, forced them to convert to Islam, and filled the prisons with Samaritan men, women, and children, keeping them there until many of them perished from hunger and thirst. He had also demanded payment for enabling them to circumcise their sons on the eighth day. As a result of the persecution, many Samaritans abandoned their religion at that time. The revolt was put down, but caliph al-Mu'tasim then increased taxes on the rebels, which sparked a second uprising. Rebel forces captured Nablus, where they set fire to synagogues belonging to the Samaritan and Dosithian (Samaritan sect) faiths. The community's situation briefly improved when this uprising was put down by Abbasid forces, and High Priest Pinhas ben Netanel resumed worship in the Nablus synagogue. Under the reign of al-Wāthiq bi-llāh, Abu-Harb Tamim, who had the support of Yaman tribes, led yet another uprising. He captured Nablus and caused many to flee, the Samaritan High Priest was injured and later died of his wounds in Hebron. The Samaritans could not go back to their homes until Abu-Harb tamim was vanquished and captured (842 CE).

A number of restrictions on the dhimmi were reinstituted during the reign of the Abbasid Caliph al-Mutawakkil (847–861 CE), prices increased once more, and many people experienced severe poverty. "Many people lost faith as a result of the terrible price increases and because they became weary of paying the jizya. There were many sons and families who left their faith and became lost". The tradition of men wearing a red tarboosh may also go back to an order by al-Mutawakkil, that required non-Muslims to be distinguished from Muslims. However, this is disputed because praying while wearing a tarboosh was easier for Muslims, because they put their heads to the ground during Salah (daily prayers).

The numerous instances of Samaritans converting to Islam that are mentioned in the Chronicle of Abu l-Fath are all connected to economic difficulties that led to widespread poverty among the Samaritan population, anarchy that left Samaritans defenseless against Muslim attackers, and attempts by those people and others to force conversion on the Samaritans. It is crucial to keep in mind that the Samaritan community was the smallest among the other dhimmi communities and that it was also situated in Samaria, where Muslim settlement continued to expand as evidenced by the text; by the ninth century, villages such as Sinjil and Jinsafut were already Muslim. This makes it possible to assume that the Samaritans were more vulnerable than other dhimmi, what greatly broadened the extent of their Islamization.

Archaeological data demonstrates that during the 8th and 9th centuries, winepresses west of Samaria stopped operating, but the villages to which they belonged persisted. Such sites could be securely identified as Samaritan in some of those cases, and it is likely in others. According to one theory, the local Samaritans who converted to Islam kept their villages going but were barred by Islamic law from making wine. These findings date to the Abbasid period, and are in accordance with the Islamization process as described in the historical sources.

As time goes on, more information from recorded sources refers to Nablus and less to the vast agricultural regions that the Samaritans had previously inhabited. Hence, the Abbasid era marks the disappearance of Samaritan rural habitation in Samaria. By the end of the period, Samaritans were mainly centered in Nablus, while other communities persisted in Caesarea, Cairo, Damascus, Aleppo, Sarepta, and Ascalon. The Samaritans transitioned from speaking Aramaic and Arabic to exclusively speaking Arabic starting from the 11th century onward.

=== Crusader period ===
During the Crusades, the Franks took over Nablus, where the majority of Samaritans lived. (Note: Benjamin of Tudela, who passed through the region in 1170, said that the Samaritan population was more numerous than that of the Jews (1,200) and estimated there were 1,000 Samaritans in Nablus, 200 in Caesarea and 300 in Ascalon, not mentioning those in Acre and Gaza. He also counted 400 in Damascus (Kedar 1989, p. 84).) Massacres took place in Samaritan maritime communities in Arsuf, Caesarea, Acre and perhaps Ascalon. During the initial razzia in Nablus the invading Franks destroyed Samaritan buildings and sometime later tore down their ritual bath and synagogue on Mt. Gerizim. Christians bearing crosses successfully pleaded for a calm transition. The calamities that befell them during the Frankish reign came from Muslims such as the commander of the Dasmascene army, Bazwȃdj, who raided Nablus in 1137 and abducted 500 Samaritan men, women and children back to Damascus.

=== Ayyubid and Mamluk rule ===
Two hundred Samaritans were reportedly forced to convert to Islam in the village of Immatain by Saladin, according to a tradition recalled by a Samaritan High Priest in the 20th century; however, written sources make no reference to this event.

=== Ottoman rule ===
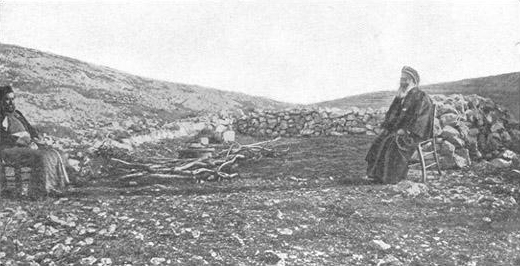
Samaritan worship center on Mount Gerizim. From a photo c. 1900 by the Palestine Exploration Fund

According to the Ottoman censuses of 1525–1526, 25 Samaritan families lived in Gaza, and 29 families lived in Nablus. In 1548–1549, there were 18 families in Gaza and 34 in Nablus. In 1596–1597, there were 8 families in Gaza, 20 in Nablus and 5 in Safed.

The Samaritan community in Egypt shrank as a result of Ottoman persecution of Samaritans who worked for the Mamluk government, with the majority of them converting to Islam. In Damascus, the majority of the Samaritan community was massacred or converted to Islam during the reign of the Ottoman Pasha Mardam Beqin in the early 17th century. The remainder of the Samaritan community there, in particular the Danafi family, which is still influential today, moved back to Nablus in the 17th century. The Matari family relocated from Gaza to Nablus at about the same time that the Marhiv family moved back from Sarafand, Lebanon. There were no longer any Samaritans in either Gaza or Damascus; only a handful remained in Gaza.

The Nablus community endured because most of the surviving diaspora returned, and they have maintained a tiny presence there to this day. In 1624, the last Samaritan High Priest of the line of Eleazar son of Aaron died without issue, but according to Samaritan tradition, descendants of Aaron's other son, Ithamar, remained and took over the office. Following the death of High Priest Shelamia ben Pinhas, Muslim persecution of Samaritans intensified, and they became the target of violent riots that led to many of them converting to Islam. In 1624, access to Mount Gerizim's summit was outlawed for the survivors, and they were only permitted to make Passover sacrifices on the mountain's eastern slopes. By the middle of the 17th century, very small Samaritan communities survived in Nablus, Gaza, and Jaffa.

The status of the Samaritan community of Nablus greatly improved in the early 18th century because one of them, Ibrahim al-Danafi, who was also a poet and an author, worked for the Tuqan family, which then dominated the city. Al-Danafi also bought the hill of Pinehas and the plot on Mount Gerizim's summit to be used by the community, but the favorable conditions that were necessary for the community's recovery did not last. The 1759 earthquake, the endemic that followed, and the other restrictions placed on the Samaritans limited the growth of their community, and by the end of the 18th century, there were only 200 people living there and living off of trade, brokerage, and tax collection.

The majority of Samaritan families in the 19th century lived in Harat el-Sumara, a crowded neighborhood in Nablus' southwest. During this time, the modest Samaritan synagogue, "el-Kanis", served as the center of the community's cultural, religious, and social life. Some Samaritans worked as clerks for the municipal authorities, while others worked in local small business and crafts in Nablus and its vicinity. Some were forced to collect alms from the growing numbers of tourists and other visitors. To keep their households and organizations functioning, the Samaritan community sometimes even turned to selling ancient manuscripts.

During the 1840s, the ulama of Nablus began asserting that the Samaritans may not be considered "People of the Book" and therefore have the same status as pagans and must convert to Islam or be executed. As a result, locals attempted to force the conversion of two children of a Samaritan widow who had a Muslim lover in 1841. Her young daughter died from fear, but her 14-year-old boy converted to Islam. Another Samaritan was later coerced into converting to Islam. Appealing to the King of France did not help. The Samaritan people were eventually helped by the Jewish Hakham Bashi Chaim Abraham Gagin, who decreed that the Samaritans are "a branch of the children of Israel, who acknowledge the truth of the Torah," and as such should be protected as a "People of the Book". As a result, the ulama ceased their preaching against Samaritans. The Samaritans also paid bribes to the Arab Muslims, totaling approximately 1000 GBP, and eventually came out of their hiding places. However, they were prohibited from offering Passover sacrifices on Mount Gerizim until 1849. By the late Ottoman period, the Samaritan community dwindled to its lowest. In the 19th century, with pressure of conversion and persecution from the local rulers, the community fell to just over 100 persons.

=== Mandatory Palestine ===
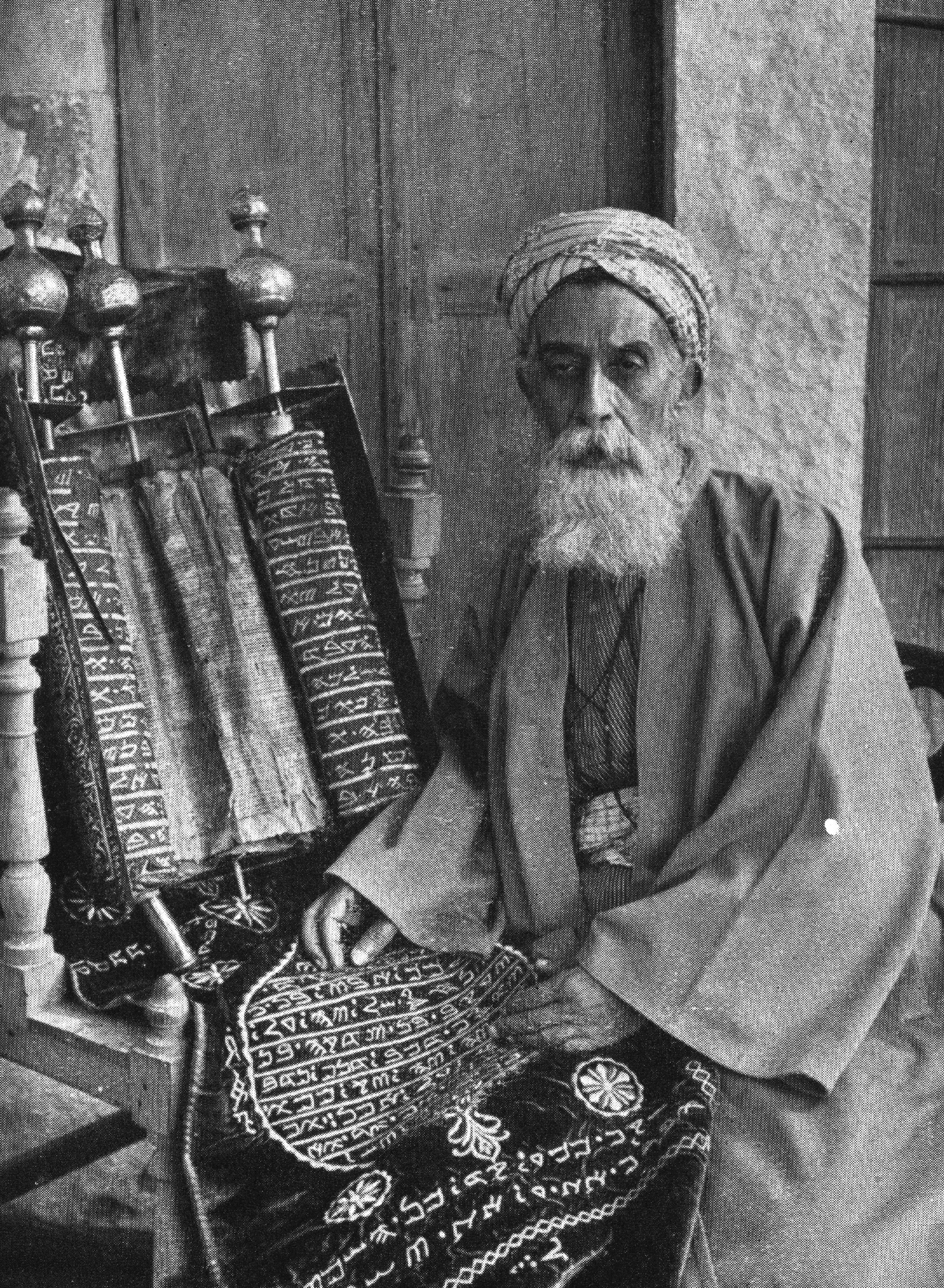
Yitzhaq ben Amram ben Shalma ben Tabia, the High Priest of the Samaritans, Nablus, c. 1920

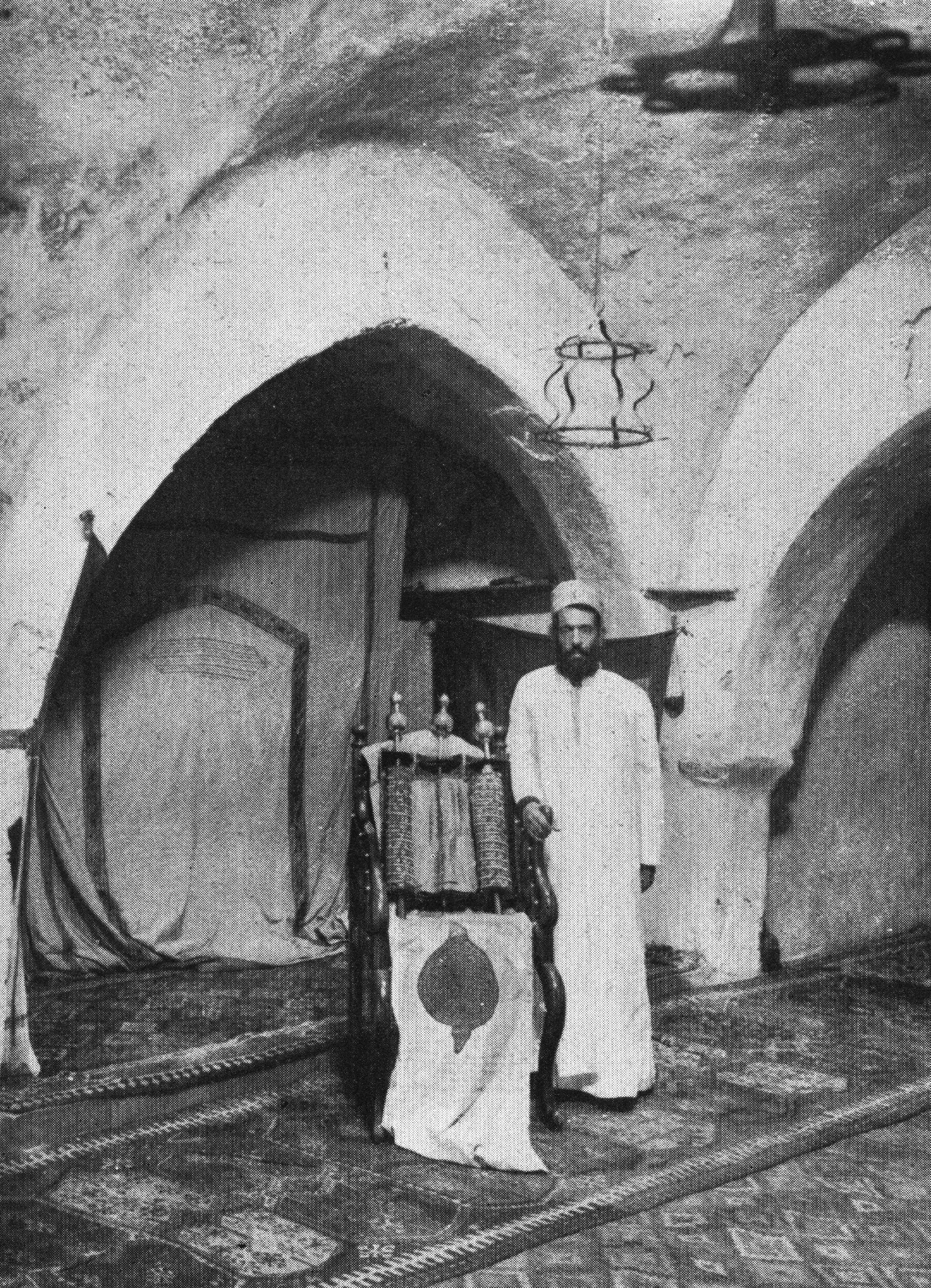
Interior of the Synagogue of the Samaritans in Nablus, c. 1920

The situation of the Samaritan community improved significantly during the British Mandate of Palestine. At that time, they began to work in the public sector, like many other groups. With better medical care and Samaritan men marrying Jewish women, the demographic status of the community improved throughout the Mandatory period. The censuses of 1922 and 1931 recorded 163 and 182 Samaritans in Palestine, respectively. 147 lived in Nablus, 12 resided in Tulkarm, 12 in Jaffa, and 6 in As-Salt, Transjordan. Later some moved to Ramat Gan and even to Haifa.

During the 1929 Palestine riots, Arab rioters attacked Samaritans who were performing the Passover sacrifice on Mount Gerizim and flung stones at them as well as their guests. The Palestine Police Force got involved and prevented any potential fatalities.

=== Israeli, Jordanian and Palestinian rule ===
After the establishment of the State of Israel, some of the Samaritans who were living in Jaffa emigrated to Samaria and lived in Nablus. By the late 1950s, around 100 Samaritans left the West Bank for Israel under an agreement with the Jordanian authorities in the West Bank. In 1954, Israeli President Yitzhak Ben-Zvi fostered a Samaritan enclave in Holon, Israel, located in 15a Ben Amram Street. During Jordanian rule in the West Bank, Samaritans from Holon were permitted to visit Mount Gerizim only once a year, on Passover.

In 1967, Israel conquered the West Bank during the Six-Day War, and the Samaritans there came under Israeli rule. Until the 1990s, most of the Samaritans in the West Bank resided in Nablus. They relocated to Mount Gerizim near the Israeli settlement of Har Brakha as a result of violence during the First Intifada (1987–1990). Consequently, all that is left of the Samaritan community in Nablus is an abandoned synagogue. The Israeli army maintains a presence in the area. The Samaritans of Nablus relocated to the village of Kiryat Luza. In the mid-1990s, the Samaritans of Kiryat Luza were granted Israeli citizenship. They also became citizens of the Palestinian Authority following the Oslo Accords. As a result, they are the only people to possess dual Israeli-Palestinian citizenship.

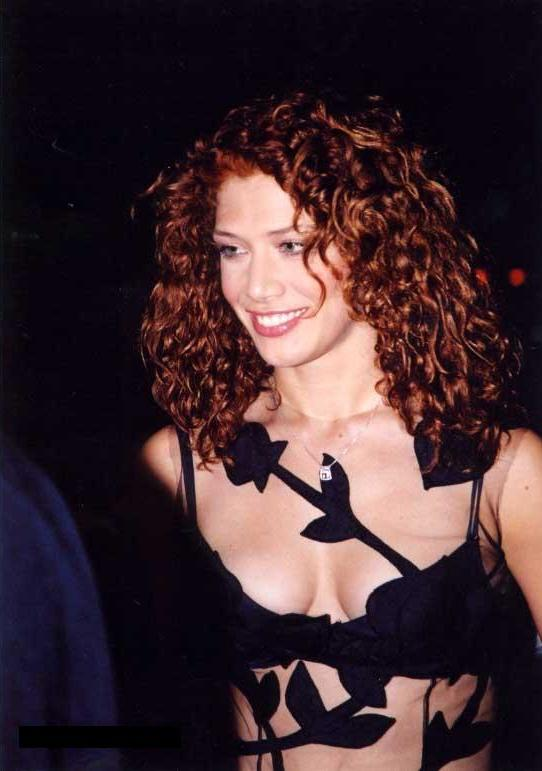
Sofi Tsedaka, an Israeli actress from the Samaritan community

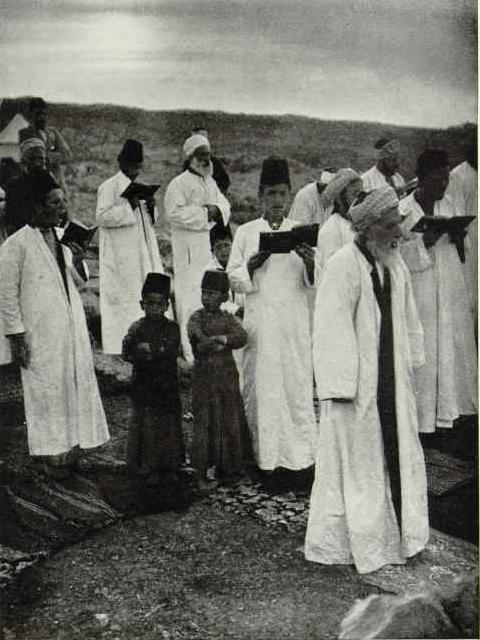
During the entire week following the Feast of the Passover, the Samaritans remain encamped on Mount Gerizim. On the last day of the encampment, they begin at dawn a pilgrimage to the crest of the sacred mount. Before setting forth on this pilgrimage, however, the men spread their cloths and repeat the creed and the story of the Creation in silence, after which, in loud voice they read the Book of Genesis and the first quarter of the Book of Exodus, ending with the story of the Passover and the flight from Egypt — John D. Whiting The National Geographic Magazine, Jan 1920

Today, Samaritans in Israel are fully integrated into society and serve in the Israel Defense Forces. The Samaritans of the West Bank seek good relations with their Palestinian neighbors while maintaining their Israeli citizenship, tend to be fluent in Hebrew and Arabic, and use both a Hebrew and Arab name. Some of them hold political office in Nablus, and at least one Samaritan, Nader Sadaqa of Nablus, has been involved in Palestinian militancy.

== Genetic studies ==
=== Samaritan lineages ===
Demographic investigations of the Samaritan community were carried out in the 1960s. Detailed pedigrees of the last 13 generations show that the Samaritans comprise four lineages:

- The priestly Cohen lineage from the tribe of Levi.
- The Tsedakah/Sadaqa lineage, claiming descent from the tribe of Manasseh
- The Joshua-Marhiv lineage, claiming descent from the tribe of Ephraim
- The Danafi lineage, claiming descent from the tribe of Ephraim

=== Y-DNA and mtDNA comparisons ===
Recently several genetic studies on the Samaritan population were made using haplogroup comparisons as well as wide-genome genetic studies. Of the 12 Samaritan males used in the analysis, 10 (83%) had Y chromosomes belonging to haplogroup J, which includes three of the four Samaritan families. The Joshua-Marhiv family belongs to Haplogroup J-M267 (formerly "J1"), while the Danafi and Tsedakah families belong to haplogroup J-M172 (formerly "J2"), and can be further distinguished by the M67 SNP—the derived allele of which has been found in the Danafi family—and the PF5169 SNP found in the Tsedakah family. However the biggest and most important Samaritan family, the Cohen family (Tradition: Tribe of Levi), was found to belong to haplogroup E.

A 2004 article on the genetic ancestry of the Samaritans by Shen et al. concluded from a sample comparing Samaritans to several Jewish populations, all currently living in Israel—representing the Beta Israel, Ashkenazi Jews, Iraqi Jews, Libyan Jews, Moroccan Jews, and Yemenite Jews, as well as Israeli Druze and Palestinians—that "the principal components analysis suggested a common ancestry of Samaritan and Jewish patrilineages. Most of the former may be traced back to a common ancestor in what is today identified as the paternally inherited Israelite high priesthood (Cohanim) with a common ancestor projected to the time of the Assyrian conquest of the kingdom of Israel." Moreover, the research paper states "Samaritan and Jewish Y-chromosomes have a much greater affinity than do those of the Samaritans, and their longtime geographical neighbors, the Palestinians. However, this is not the case for the mtDNA haplotypes. In fact, Table 4 shows that distances of Samaritans to Jews and Palestinians for mtDNA are about the same." The mitochondrial lineages of Samaritans is most similar to Iraqi Jews. The research suggests this is because Iraqi Jews have a preserved direct lineage from ancient Babylonian, and pre-Exilic Jewish populations just like Samaritan women of today who are descended from ancient pre-Assyrian exile Israelite women.

=== Autosomal DNA ===
Autosomally, the Samaritans cluster with other Levantine populations. The Samaritans also resemble other Levantine groups in terms of their admixture, but they do not have much of the sub-Saharan African admixture found in small amounts in their Arab neighbours. They also show significant genetic drift that distinguishes them from others.

== Demographics ==
=== Figures ===
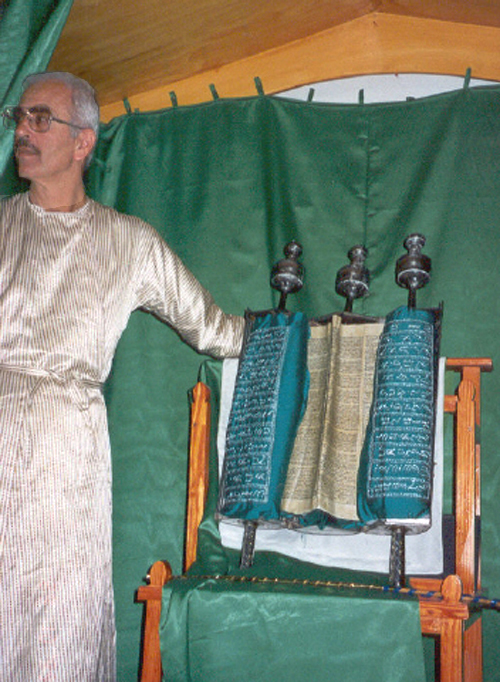
A Samaritan and the Samaritan Torah

An estimated 1 million Samaritans lived during biblical times, but in recent times the numbers are smaller. There were 100 in 1786 and 141 in 1919, then 150 in 1967. This grew to 745 in 2011, 751 in 2012, 756 in 2013, 760 in 2014, 777 in 2015, 785 in 2016, 796 in 2017, 810 in 2018 and 820 in 2019. The Samaritan community dropped in numbers during the various periods of Muslim rule in the region. The Samaritans could not rely on foreign assistance as much as the Christians did, nor on a large number of diaspora immigrants as did the Jews. The once-flourishing community declined over time, either through emigration or conversion to Islam among those who remained.

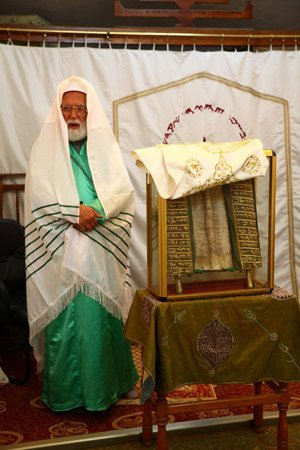
The current Samaritan High Priest: "Aabed El Ben Asher Ben Matzliach", 133rd generation since Elazar the Son of Aaron The Priest, from the line of Ithamar. In priestly office 2013–present.

Today, half reside in modern homes at Kiryat Luza on Mount Gerizim, which is sacred to them, and the rest in Holon. There are also four Samaritan families residing in Binyamina-Giv'at Ada, Matan, and Ashdod. As a small community physically divided between neighbors in a hostile region, Samaritans have been hesitant to overtly take sides in the Arab–Israeli conflict, fearing that doing so could lead to negative repercussions. Samaritans who are Israeli citizens are drafted into the military, along with the Jewish citizens of Israel.

Relations of Samaritans with Israeli Jews, Muslim and Christian Palestinians in neighboring areas have been mixed. Samaritans living in both Israel and in the West Bank have Israeli citizenship.

Samaritans in the Palestinian Authority-ruled territories are a minority in the midst of a Muslim majority. They had a reserved seat in the Palestinian Legislative Council in the election of 1996, but the Palestinian Authority passed a law in 2004 that eliminated this, and since then, the Samaritans have been deprived of representation on the council. Samaritans living in the West Bank have been granted passports by both Israel and the Palestinian Authority.

Around the world, there are significant and growing numbers of communities, families, and individuals who, despite not being part of the Samaritan community, identify with and observe the tenets and traditions of the Samaritans' ethnic religion. The largest community outside the Levant, the "Shomrey HaTorah" of Brazil (generally known as "Neo-Samaritans Worldwide"), had approximately hundreds of members as of February 2020.

=== Community survival ===
VOA report about Samaritan population loss from 2008

One of the biggest problems facing the community today is the issue of continuity. With such a small population, divided into only four families or houses (Cohen, Tsedakah, Danafi, and Marhiv, with the Matar family dying out in 1968), (Note: A process of segmentation has slightly multiplied this number (Schreiber 2014, pp. 164–167).) and a general refusal to accept converts, it is common for Samaritans to marry within their extended families, even first cousins. There has been a history of genetic disorders within the group due to the small gene pool. To counter this, the Holon Samaritan community has allowed men from the community to marry non-Samaritan (primarily Israeli Jewish) women, provided that the women agree to follow Samaritan religious practices. There is a six-month trial period before officially joining the Samaritan community to see whether this is a commitment that the woman would like to take. This often poses a problem for the women, who are typically less than eager to adopt the strict interpretation of biblical (Levitical) laws regarding menstruation, by which they must live in a separate dwelling during their periods and after childbirth. There have been a few instances of intermarriage. In addition, all marriages within the Samaritan community are first approved by a geneticist at Tel HaShomer Hospital, in order to prevent the spread of genetic disorders. In meetings arranged by "international marriage agencies", a small number of women from Russia and Ukraine who agree to observe Samaritan religious practices have been allowed to marry into the Qiryat Luza Samaritan community in an effort to expand the gene pool. Polygamy is reported to have been practiced among Samaritans until sometime in the 19th century. Today it is practically unheard of, due to the low availability of women and, among those Samaritans living within Israeli territory, it being illegal.

The Samaritan community in Israel also faces demographic challenges as some young people leave the community and convert to Judaism. A notable example is Israeli television presenter Sofi Tsedaka, who has made a documentary about her leaving the community at age 18.

The head of the community is the Samaritan High Priest, who is the 133rd generation since Ithamar, a son of Aaron the priest's line from 1624 CE onward; before then, the line of priesthood went through Elazar, son of Aaron the priest. The current high priest is Aabed-El ben Asher ben Matzliach who assumed the office on 19 April 2013. The High Priest of every generation is selected by the eldest in age from the priestly family and resides on Mount Gerizim.

=== Samaritan origins of Palestinian Muslims in Nablus and its vicinity ===
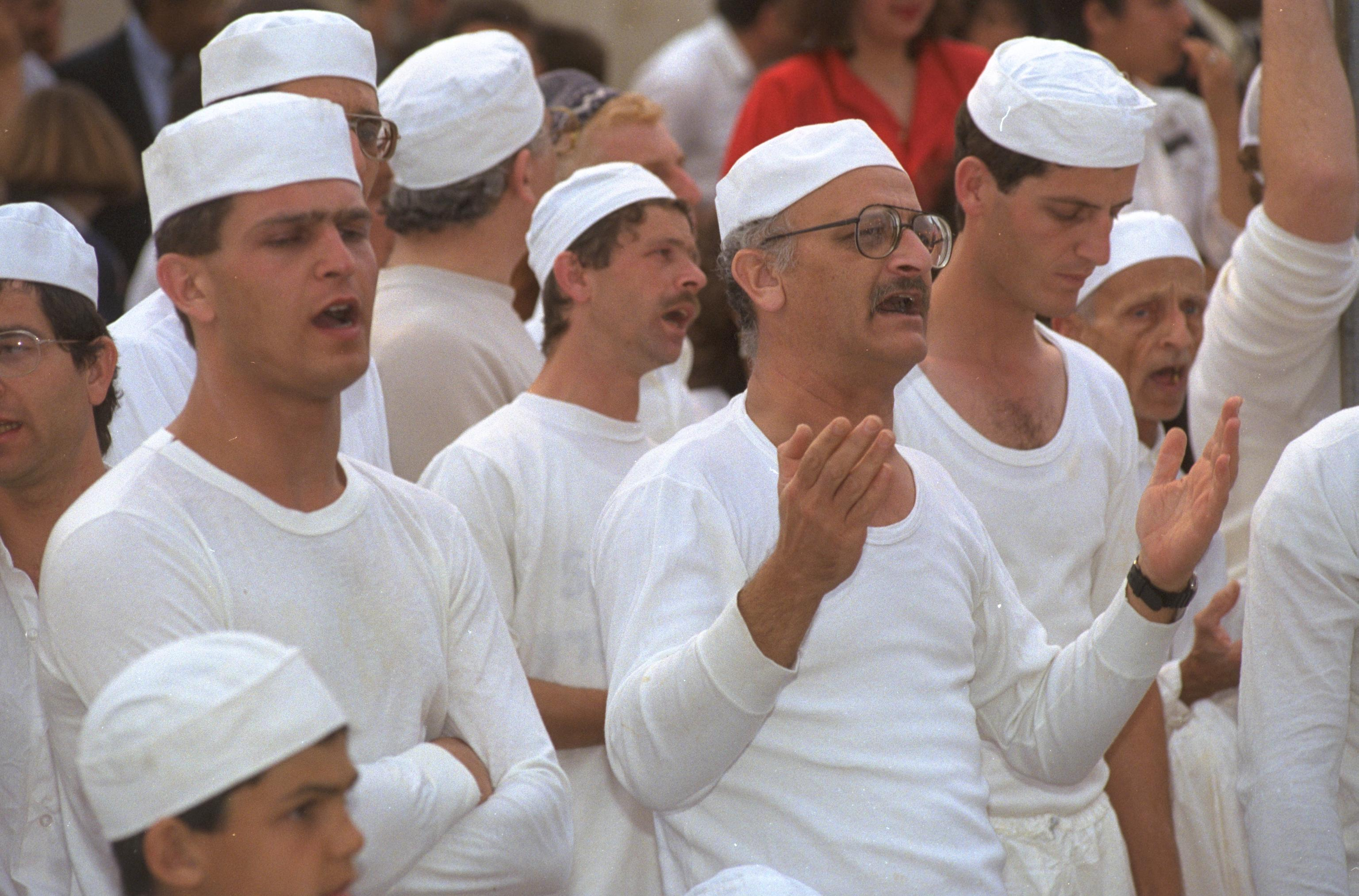
Samaritans celebrating Passover on Mount Gerizim in the West Bank

Much of the local Palestinian population of Nablus is believed to be descended from Samaritans who converted to Islam. Traditions of Samaritan ancestry were also recorded in villages in the vicinity, such as Hajjah. Even today, certain Nabulsi family names such as Al-Amad, Al-Samri, Maslamani, Yaish, and Shakhsheer among others, are associated with Samaritan ancestry. The Yaish family of Nablus, for example, is said to be descended from the Samaritan Mitawiyah family of the Tribe of Manasseh, founded by Mitwayyah, who himself descended from Magged, a person who lived in the 7th century.

According to the historian Fayyad Altif, large numbers of Samaritans converted due to persecution under various Muslim rulers, and because the monotheistic nature of Islam made it easy for them to accept it. During the Abbasid period, economic hardships, social disorder, and pressure from Muslim attackers, drove many Samaritans to convert to Islam. Later, the al-Hakim Edict issued by the Fatimid Caliphate in 1021, ordering Jews and Christians in the Southern Levant to convert to Islam or leave, along with another forced conversion by the rebel ibn Firāsa, hastened the Samaritans' rapid decline and nearly led to their extinction as a distinct religious community. The Samaritans themselves describe the Ottoman period as the worst period in their modern history, as many Samaritan families were forced to convert to Islam during that time. As a result, the Samaritans decreased from nearly a million and a half in late Roman (Byzantine) times to 146 people by the end of the Ottoman period.

Samaritan historian Benyamim Tsedaka noted that many Samaritans who converted to Islam retained their original surnames, passing them on to future generations. Consequently, in most villages with names of Hebrew origin, but altered by Arabic pronunciation, Arab families still bear the surnames of their Samaritan ancestors. In Nablus itself, he notes, some Muslims openly acknowledge their Samaritan ancestry. For instance, in 1968, Fatah militant Naser Sharshir suggested the possibility of having Samaritan blood in his lineage, tracing back to his great-grandfather.

In 1940, Israeli historian and future president Yitzhak Ben-Zvi wrote an article in which he stated that two thirds of the residents of Nablus and the surrounding neighboring villages were of Samaritan origin. He mentioned the name of several Palestinian Muslim families as having Samaritan origins, including the Al-Amad, Al-Samri, Buwarda and Kasem families, who protected Samaritans from Muslim persecution in the 1850s. Additionally, he wrote that these families had written records testifying to their Samaritan ancestry, which were maintained by their priests and elders.

== Samaritanism ==
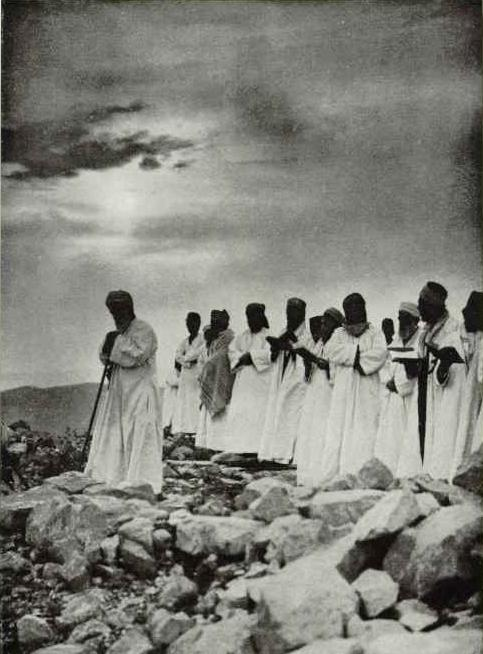
Samaritans pray before the Holy Rock on Mount Gerizim.

Samaritanism is centered on the Samaritan Pentateuch, which Samaritans believe to be the original and unaltered version of the Torah that was given to Moses and the Israelites on Mount Sinai. The Samaritan Pentateuch contains some differences from the Masoretic version of the Torah used in Judaism; according to Samaritan tradition, key parts of the Jewish text were fabricated by Ezra. (Note: "Samaritan and Islamic scholars, as well as several of the Church Fathers, argue that Ezra falsified the Bible when he rewrote it and that the Torah we have now could not be the same as the one that Moses dictated." (Fried 2014, p. 141)) The Samaritan version of the Book of Joshua also differs from the Jewish version, which focuses on Shiloh. According to Samaritan tradition, Joshua built a temple (al-haikal) on Mount Gerizim and placed therein a tabernacle (al-maškan) in the second year of the Israelites' entry into the land of Canaan. (Note: "The Samaritan Tolidah Chronicle assumes a period of 260 years for the 'Time of Divine Favour'...A few years ago Abram Spiro suggested that if we calculate 360 years backwards from the point of time of the destruction of the Samaritan temple by John Hyrcanus, then we arrive at 388 B.C. as an entirely possible date for the construction of the Samaritan temple on Mt Gerizim. Thus Spiro considered the 260 'years of divine favour' to be the time in which the Samaritans possessed a temple, and he thought they had projected this back into the time of Moses since they had no ancient history."(Bowman 2004, p. 35))

According to Samaritan scripture and tradition, Mount Gerizim, located near the Biblical city of Shechem (on the southern side of modern-day Nablus, West Bank), has been venerated as the holiest place for the Israelites since the conquest of Canaan by Joshua, long before the Temple in Jerusalem was established under Davidic and Solomonic rule over the United Kingdom of Israel. This view differs from Jewish belief which views the Temple Mount in Jerusalem as the holiest site in the world to worship God. It is commonly taught in Samaritan tradition that there are 13 references to Mount Gerizim in the Torah to prove their claim of holiness in contrast to Judaism, which relies solely on the later Jewish prophets and writings to back their claims of the holiness of Jerusalem.

Other Samaritan tradition books include the Memar Marqah ('The teaching of Marqah'), the Samaritan liturgy known as "the Defter", and Samaritan law codes and biblical commentaries.

Samaritans outside the Holy Land observe most Samaritan practices and rituals such as the Sabbath, ritual purity, and all festivals of Samaritanism with the exception of the Passover sacrifice, which can only be observed at Mount Gerizim.

=== Location of sacrifice ===
According to Samaritans, it was on Mount Gerizim that Abraham was commanded by God to offer his son Isaac as a sacrifice. God then causes the sacrifice to be interrupted, explaining that this was the ultimate test of Abraham's obedience, as a result of which all the world would be blessed.

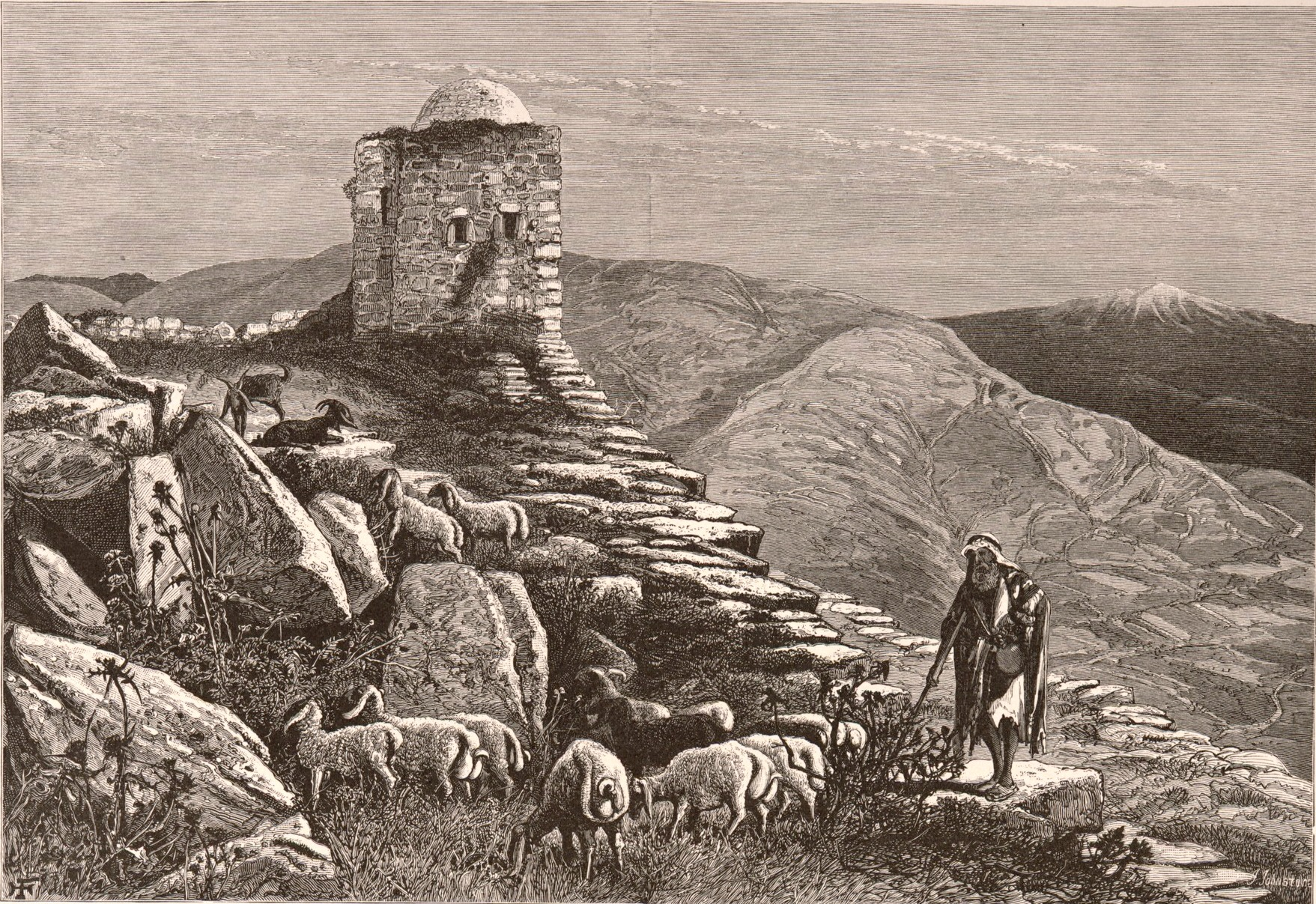
Ruins on Mount Gerizim c. 1880.

The Torah mentions the place where God chooses to establish his name (Deuteronomy 12:5), and Judaism believes this refers to Jerusalem. In contrast, the Samaritan text speaks of the place where God has chosen to establish his name, and Samaritans identify it as Mount Gerizim, making it the focus of their spiritual values.

The legitimacy of the Judaic versus Samaritan belief was argued by Jewish scholar Andronicus ben Meshullam in the 2nd century BCE at the court of King Ptolemy VI Philometor.

In the New Testament, the Gospel of John describes an encounter between a Samaritan woman and Jesus. When the woman realizes that Jesus is the Messiah, she asks Him whether Mount Gerizim or Jerusalem is where God commanded Abraham to bind Isaac. Jesus affirms the Judaic belief, saying "You [the Samaritans] worship what you do not know", although he also says: "a time is coming when you will worship the Father neither on this mountain nor in Jerusalem." (BSB)

=== Religious beliefs ===
- There is one God, YHWH (informally referred to by Samaritans as Shema), the same God recognized by the Hebrew prophets.
- The Torah was given by God to Moses.
- Mount Gerizim, not Jerusalem, is the one true sanctuary chosen by Israel's God.
- Many Samaritans believe that at the end of days, the dead will be resurrected by the Taheb, a restorer (possibly a prophet, some say Moses).
- Resurrection and Paradise. Samaritans accept the resurrection of the dead on the basis of Deuteronomy 32 also known as the Song of Moses, a tradition that is traced back to their sage Marqah.
- The priests are the interpreters of the law and the keepers of tradition; scholars are secondary to the priesthood.
- The authority of post-Torah sections of the Tanakh, and classical Jewish Rabbinical works (the Talmud, comprising the Mishnah and the Gemara) is rejected.
- They have a significantly different version of the Ten Commandments (for example, their 10th commandment is about the sanctity of Mount Gerizim).

The Samaritans have retained an offshoot of the Ancient Hebrew script and maintain a High Priesthood. The Samaritans have also retained the practice of slaughtering and eating lambs on Passover eve. In the Samaritan calendar, the religious year begins in the spring and the civil year begins in the sevent month, Tishrei. The celebration of the first month's beginning around springtime as the New Year. Yom Teru'ah (the biblical name for "Rosh Hashanah"), at the beginning of Tishrei, is not considered a New Year as it is in Rabbinic Judaism. The Samaritan Pentateuch differs from the Jewish Masoretic Text as well. Some differences are doctrinal: for example, the Samaritan Torah explicitly states that Mount Gerizim is "the place that God has chosen" to establish his name, as opposed to the Jewish Torah that refers to "the place that God chooses". Other differences are minor and seem more or less accidental.

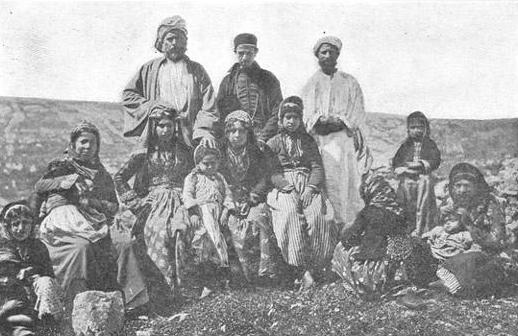
Samaritans, from a photo c. 1900 by the Palestine Exploration Fund.

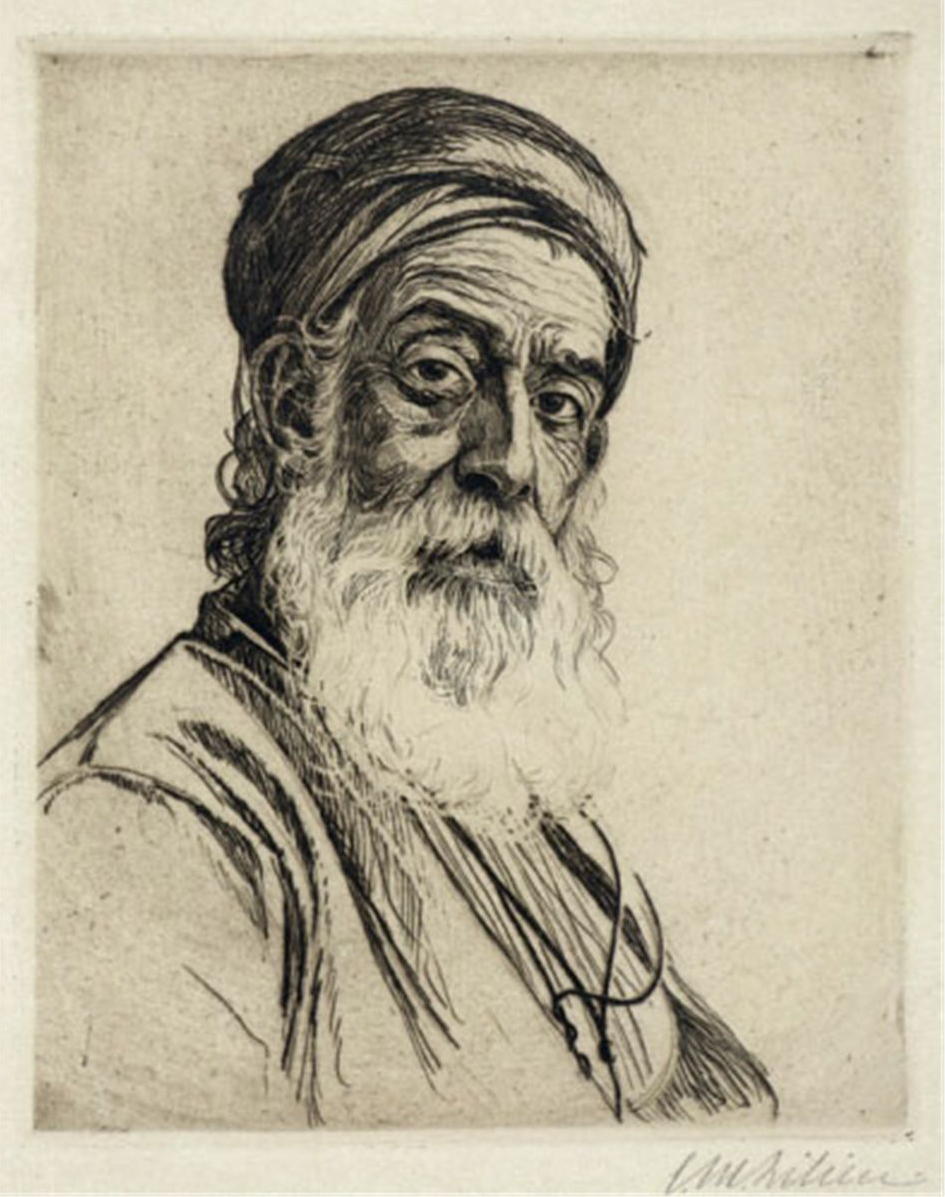
The Samaritan, engraving by Ephraim Moses Lilien. 1920

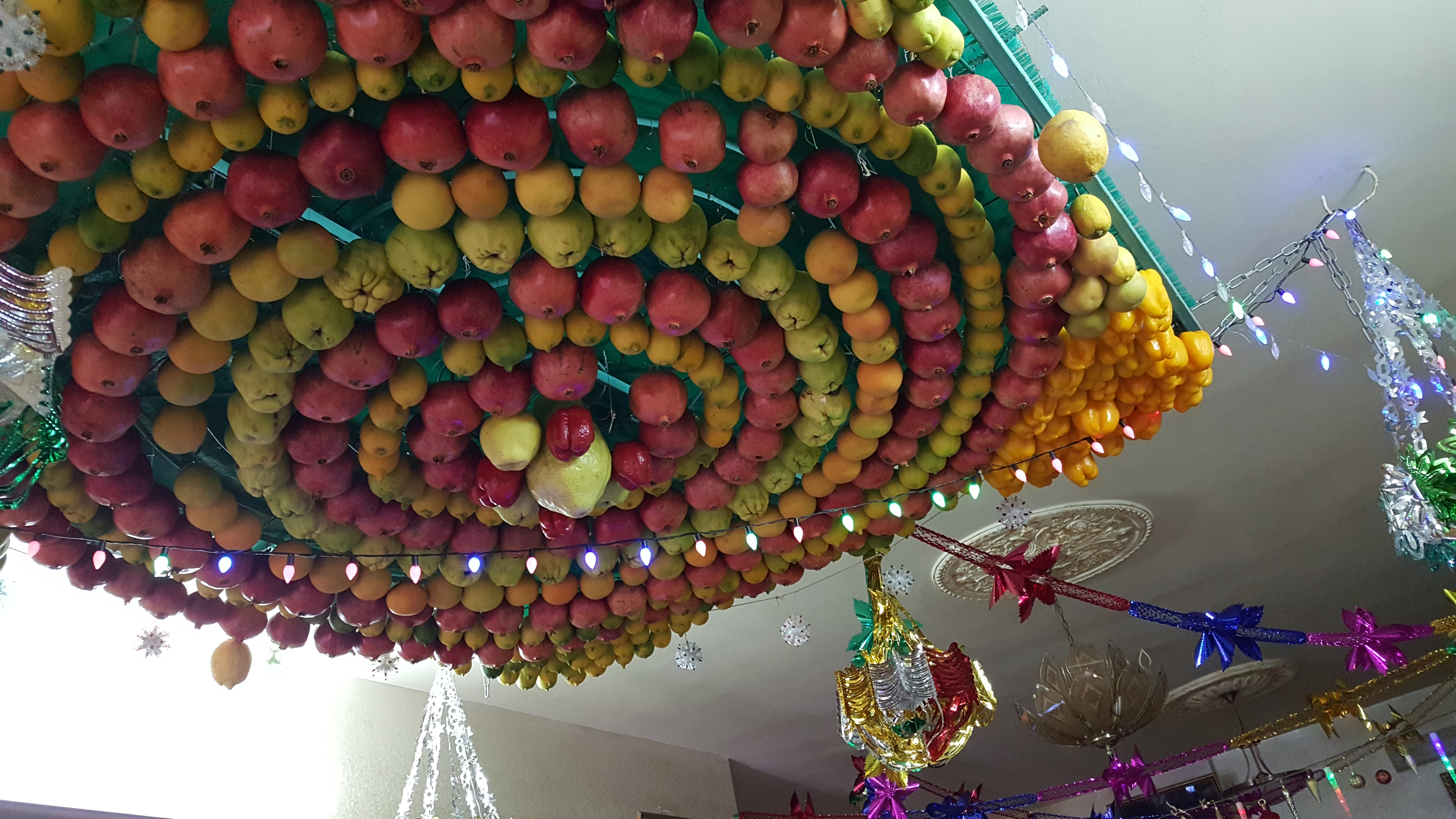
Sukkot on Mount Gerizim

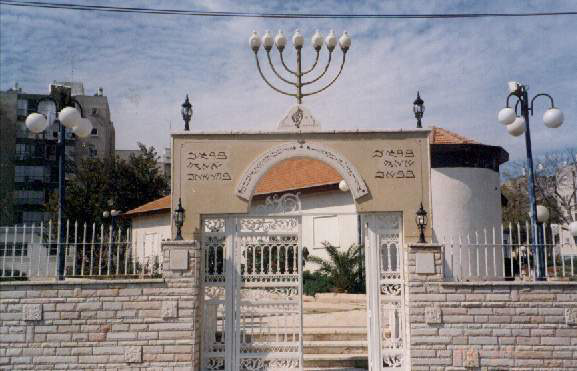
Entrance to a modern Samaritan synagogue in Neve Pinchas neighborhood, Holon, Israel

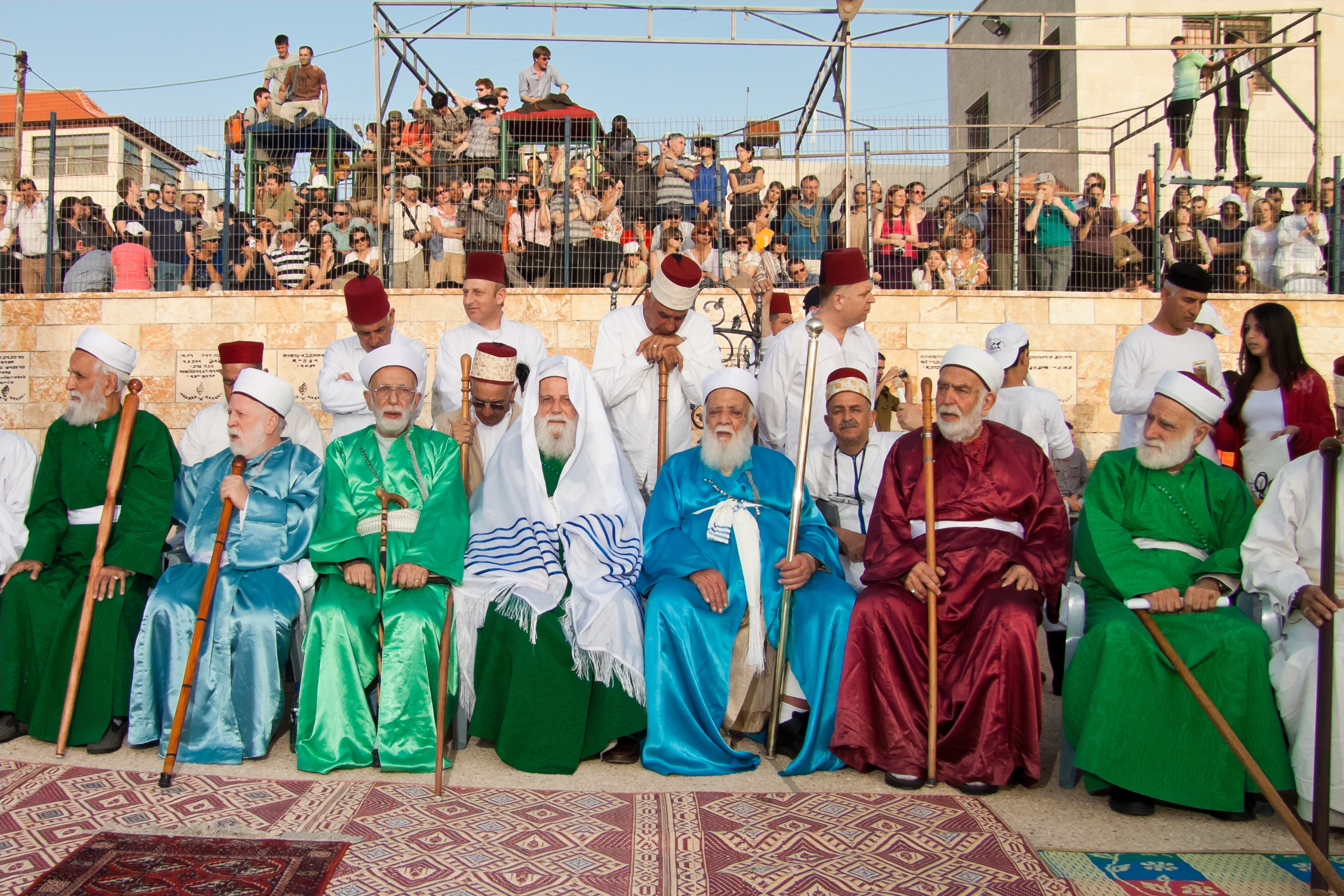
Samaritans' Passover at Mount Gerizim

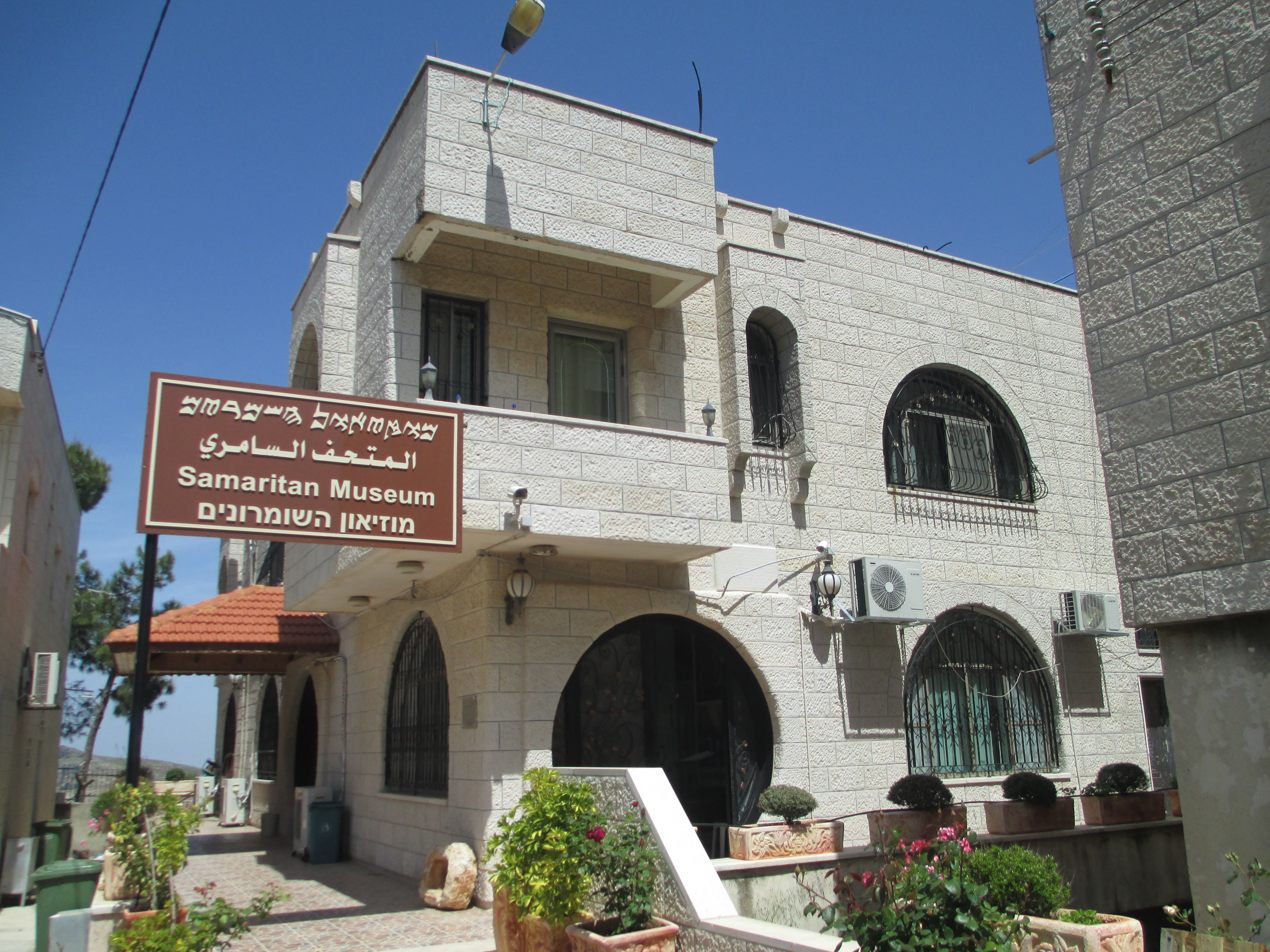
The Samaritan Museum, Kiryat Luza, Mount Gerizim

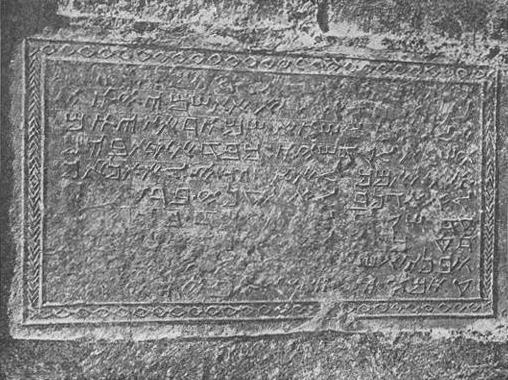
Ancient inscription in Samaritan Hebrew. From a photo c. 1900 by the Palestine Exploration Fund.

=== Relationship to Rabbinic Judaism ===
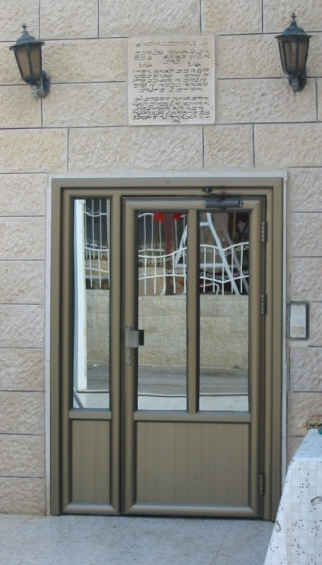
The Samaritan mezuzah engraved above the front door

Samaritans refer to themselves as Benai Yisrael ("Children of Israel"), which is a term used by all Jewish denominations as a name for the Jewish people as a whole. They, however, do not refer to themselves as Yehudim (literally "Judeans"), the standard Hebrew name for Jews.

The Talmudic attitude expressed in tractate Kutim is that they are to be treated as Jews in matters where their practice coincides with Rabbinic Judaism but as non-Jews where their practice differs. Some claim that since the 19th century, Rabbinic Judaism has regarded the Samaritans as a Jewish sect and the term "Samaritan Jews" has been used for them.

=== Religious texts ===
Samaritan law is not the same as Halakha (Rabbinic Jewish law). The Samaritans have several groups of religious texts, which correspond to Jewish Halakha. A few examples of such texts are:

- Torah
  - Samaritan Pentateuch: There are some 6,000 differences between the Samaritan Pentateuch and the Masoretic Jewish Pentateuch text; and, according to one estimate, 1,900 points of agreement between it and the Greek LXX version. Several passages in the New Testament would also appear to echo a Torah textual tradition consistent with that conserved in the Samaritan text. There are several theories regarding the similarities. The variations, some corroborated by readings in the Old Latin, Syriac and Ethiopian translations, attest to the antiquity of the Samaritan text.
- Historical writings
  - Samaritan Chronicle, The Tolidah (Creation to the time of Abishah)
  - Samaritan Chronicle, The Chronicle of Joshua (Israel during the time of divine favor) (4th century, in Arabic and Aramaic)
  - Samaritan Chronicle, Adler (Israel from the time of divine disfavor until the exile)
  - Samaritan Chronicle, The Kitab al-Tarikh of Abu 'l-Fath (Historical chronology from Adam to Mohammad)
- Hagiographical texts
  - Samaritan Halakhic Text, The Hillukh (Code of Halakha, marriage, circumcision, etc.)
  - Samaritan Halakhic Text, The Kitab at-Tabbah (Halakha and interpretation of some verses and chapters from the Torah, written by Abu Al Hassan 12th century CE)
  - Samaritan Halakhic Text, The Kitab al-Kafi (Book of Halakha, written by Yosef Al Ascar 14th century CE)
  - Al-Asatir—legendary Aramaic texts from the 11th and 12th centuries, containing:
    - Haggadic Midrash, Abu'l Hasan al-Suri
    - Haggadic Midrash, Memar Markah—3rd or 4th century theological treatises attributed to Hakkam Markha
    - Haggadic Midrash, Pinkhas on the Taheb
    - Haggadic Midrash, Molad Maseh (On the birth of Moses)
- Defter, prayer book of psalms and hymns.
- Samaritan Haggadah

== Christian sources: New Testament ==
Samaria or Samaritans are mentioned in the New Testament books of Matthew, Luke, John and Acts. The Gospel of Mark contains no mention of Samaritans or Samaria. The best known reference to the Samaritans is the Parable of the Good Samaritan, found in the Gospel of Luke. The following references are found:

- When instructing his disciples as to how they should spread the word, Jesus tells them not to visit any Gentile or Samaritan city, but instead, go to the "lost sheep of Israel".
- A Samaritan village rejected a request from messengers travelling ahead of Jesus for hospitality, because the villagers did not want to facilitate a pilgrimage to Jerusalem, a practice which they saw as a violation of the Law of Moses. Two of his disciples want to "call down fire from heaven and destroy them," but Jesus rebukes them.
- The Parable of the Good Samaritan.
- Jesus healed ten lepers, of whom only one returned to praise God, and he was a Samaritan.
- Jesus asks a Samaritan woman of Sychar for water from Jacob's Well, and after spending two days telling her townsfolk "all things" as the woman expected the Messiah to do, and presumably repeating the Good News that he is the Messiah, many Samaritans become followers of Jesus. He accepts without comment the woman's assertion that she and her people are Israelites, descendants of Jacob.
- Jesus is accused of being a Samaritan and being demon-possessed. He denies the latter accusation explicitly, and denies the former previously—having already done so in his conversation with the Samaritan woman.
- Christ tells the apostles that they would receive power when the Holy Spirit comes upon them and that they would be his witnesses in "Jerusalem, and in all Judaea, and in Samaria, and unto the uttermost part of the earth."
- The Apostles are being persecuted. Philip preaches the Gospel to a city in Samaria, and the Apostles in Jerusalem hear about it. So they send the Apostles Peter and John to pray for and lay hands on the baptized believers, who then receive the Holy Spirit (vs. 17). They then return to Jerusalem, preaching the Gospel "in many villages of the Samaritans".
- Acts 9:31 says that at that time the churches had "rest throughout all Judaea and Galilee and Samaria".
- Acts 15:2–3 says that Paul and Barnabas were "being brought on their way by the church" and that they passed through "Phenice and Samaria, declaring the conversion of the Gentiles". (Phoenicia in several other English versions).

== Notable Samaritans ==
- Sanballat I
- Simon Magus
- Eudokia of Heliopolis
- Baba Rabba
- Justa
- Dositheos (Samaritan)
- Symmachus (translator)
- Marinus of Neapolis
- Julianus ben Sabar
- Abu'l Fath
- Sofi Tsedaka
- Nader Sadaqa

== See also ==
- Karaite Jews
- Mandaeans

== Sources ==
- Anderson, Robert T.; Giles, Terry (2001). The Keepers: An Introduction to the History and Culture of the Samaritans. Baker Publishing Group. ISBN 978-0-801-04547-9.
- Anderson, Robert T.; Giles, Terry (2002). The Keepers: An Introduction to the History and Culture of the Samaritans. Hendrickson Publishing. ISBN 978-1-56563-519-7.
- Appelbaum, Diana Muir; Appelbaum, Paul (2 November 2008). "Genetics and the Jewish identity". The Jerusalem Post.
- Aster, Shawn Zelig (2019). "Sargon in Samaria—Unusual Formulations in the Royal Inscriptions and Their Value for Historical Reconstruction". Journal of the American Oriental Society. 139 (3): 591–609.
- Barbati, Gabrielle (21 January 2013). "Israeli Election Preview: The Samaritans, Caught Between Two Votes". International Business Times. "Totaling 760 people between Kiryat Luza and Holon – up from 150 people in 1967 but down from an estimated 1 million during Biblical times"
- Ben Zvi, Yitzhak (8 October 1985). Oral telling of Samaritan traditions: Volume 780–785. A.B. Samaritan News. p. 8.
- Ben-Zvi, Yitzhak (1933). "The Origins of the Samaritans and their Tribal Division". In Mills, Eric (ed.). Census of Palestine 1931. Vol. 1. Government of Palestine. pp. 86–90.
- Bourgel, Jonathan (Fall 2016). "The Destruction of the Samaritan Temple by John Hyrcanus: A Reconsideration". Journal of Biblical Literature. 135 (3): 505–523. doi:10.15699/jbl.1353.2016.3129. JSTOR 10.15699/jbl.1353.2016.3129.
- Bourgel, Jonathan (November 2019). "The Samaritans during the Hasmonean Period: The Affirmation of a Discrete Identity?". Religions. 10 (11): 628. doi:10.3390/rel10110628.
- Bowman, John (1975). The Samaritan Problem. Pickwick Press.
- Bowman, John (1977). Samaritan Documents: Relating to their History, Religion, and Life. Pittsburgh theological monograph series. Vol. 2. Wipf and Stock. ISBN 978-0-915138-27-2.
- Bowman, John (2004). The Samaritan Problem: Studies in the Relationships of Samaritanism, Judaism, and Early Christianity. Wipf and Stock. ISBN 978-0-915-13804-3.
- "Contact: the AB Institute for Israelite Samaritan Studies". Israelite Samaritan Information Institute.
- Coogan, Michael David (2009). A Brief Introduction to the Old Testament: The Hebrew Bible in Its Context. Oxford University Press. ISBN 978-0-195-33272-8.
- Cowley, A. (October 1894). "The Samaritan Liturgy, and Reading of the Law". Jewish Quarterly Review. 7 (1): 121–140. doi:10.2307/1450335. JSTOR 1450335.
- Crown, Alan D., ed. (1989). The Samaritans. Mohr Siebeck. ISBN 978-3-161-45237-6.
- Crown, Alan D. (July–October 1991). "Redating the Schism between the Judaeans and the Samaritans". The Jewish Quarterly Review. 82 (1/2): 17–50. doi:10.2307/1455003. JSTOR 1455003.
- Crown, Alan David (2005) [First published 1984]. A Bibliography of the Samaritans: Revised Expanded and Annotated (3rd ed.). Scarecrow Press. ISBN 978-0-810-85659-2.
- Crown, Alan David; Pummer, Reinhard; Tal, Abraham, eds. (1993). A Companion to Samaritan Studies. Mohr Siebeck. ISBN 978-3-161-45666-4.
- Ehrlich, Michael (2022). The Islamization of the Holy Land, 634–1800. Arc Humanity Press. ISBN 978-1-641-89222-3.
- Epiphanius (2009) [First published 1987]. The Panarion of Ephiphanius of Salamis. Translated by Frank Williams. BRILL. ISBN 978-9-004-17017-9.
- "Faith of the Israelite Samaritans: Four unique principles". Israelite Samaritan Information Institute. 25 January 2019.
- "FamilyTreeDNA – Israelite Samaritans". Family Tree DNA.
- Ferguson, Jane (8 January 2013). "West Bank Samaritans fight extinction". Al Jazeera English.
- Fried, Lisbeth S. (2014). Ezra and the Law in History and Tradition. University of South Carolina Press. ISBN 978-1-611-17410-6.
- Friedman, Matti (18 March 2007). "Israeli sings for her estranged people". Yahoo! News. Associated Press. Archived from the original on 26 March 2007.
- Gaster, Moses (1925). The Samaritans: Their History, Doctrines and Literature. The Schweich Lectures for 1923. Oxford University Press.
- "Good Samaritans". The Jewish Week. 5 April 2011.
- Gurevich, Eliyahu, ed. (2010). Tosefta Berachot: Translated into English with a Commentary. Eliyahu Gurevich. ISBN 978-0-557-38968-1.
- Heinsdorff, Cornel (2003). Christus, Nikodemus und die Samaritanerin bei Juvencus. Mit einem Anhang zur lateinischen Evangelienvorlage [Christ, Nicodemus and the Samaritan Woman at Juvencus. With an appendix to the Latin Gospel template]. Untersuchungen zur antiken Literatur und Geschichte (in German). Vol. 67. ISBN 978-3-110-17851-7.
- Hjelm, Ingrid (2000). Samaritans and Early Judaism: A Literary Analysis. Journal for the Study of the Old Testament. Supplement Series, 303. Sheffield Academic Press. ISBN 978-1-841-27072-2.
- Hofman, Shlomo (2007). "Samaritans". In Skolnik, Fred (ed.). Encyclopedia Judaica. Vol. 17 (2nd ed.). Thomson Gale. pp. 718–740.
- Ireton, Sean (2003). Strategies for Survival of an Ethno-religious Minority in the Twenty First Century (Thesis). Anthrobase/University of Kent at Canterbury MA Dissertation for Ethnicity, Nationalism and Identity.
- Jackson, Wayne (n.d.). "Jesus and the Samaritan Woman / A Samaritan Woman Approaches: 1". Christian Courier.
- Kartveit, Magnar (2009). The Origin of the Samaritans. Brill. ISBN 978-9-004-17819-9.
- Kartveit, Magnar (4 December 2019). "Theories of the Origin of the Samaritans—Then and Now". Religions. 10 (12): 661. doi:10.3390/rel10120661. hdl:11250/2649767.
- Kedar, Benjamin Z. (1989). "The Frankish Period". In Crown, Alan D. (ed.). The Samaritans. Mohr Siebeck. pp. 82–94. ISBN 978-3-161-45237-6.
- "Keepers: Israelite Samaritan Identity Since Joshua bin Nun". Israelite Samaritan Information Institute. 26 May 2020.
- Knoppers, Gary N. (2013). Jews and Samaritans: The Origins and History of Their Early Relations. OUP USA. ISBN 978-0-195-32954-4.
- Law, Timothy Michael (2013). When God Spoke Greek: The Septuagint and the Making of the Christian Bible. Oxford University Press. ISBN 978-0-199-78172-0.
- Levy-Rubin, Milka (2000). "New Evidence Relating to the Process of Islamization in Palestine in the Early Muslim Period: The Case of Samaria". Journal of the Economic and Social History of the Orient. 43 (3): 257–276. doi:10.1163/156852000511303. JSTOR 3632444.
- Macdonald, John (1964). The Theology of the Samaritans. New Testament Library. London: SCM Press.
- Magen, Yitzakh (2007). "The Dating of the First Phase of the Samaritan Temple on Mt Gerizim in Light of Archaeological Evidence". In Lipschitz, Oded; Knoppers, Gary N.; Albertz, Rainer (eds.). Judah and the Judeans in the Fourth Century B.C.E. Eisenbrauns. pp. 157–212 [187]. ISBN 978-1-575-06130-6.
- Manzur, Ibn (1979). "SMR". Lisan al Arab. Vol. 21. Al-dar al-Misriya li-l-talif wa-l-taryamar. ISBN 978-0-866-85541-9.
- Matassa, Lidia (2007). "Unravelling the Myth of the Synagogue on Delos". Bulletin of the Anglo–Israel Archaeological Society. 25: 81–115.
- Montgomery, James A. (2006) [First published 1907]. The Samaritans, the Earliest Jewish Sect. Bohlen Lectures (1906). Eugene, Oregon: Wipf & Stock. ISBN 978-1-597-52965-5.
- Mor, Menachem; Reiterer, Friedrich V.; Winkler, Waltraud, eds. (2010). Samaritans: Past and Present: Current Studies. Studia Samaritana, 5 & Studia Judaica, 53. De Gruyter. ISBN 978-3-110-19497-5.
- "Mount Gerizim and the Samaritans". UNESCO World Heritage Centre. 11 October 2017.
- Nammari, Dalia (18 March 2013). "European women give hope to Samaritans". The Times of Israel.
- Oefner, Peter J.; Shen, Peidong; Höltz, George; Shpirer, Isaac; Gefel, Dov; Lavi, Tal; Wool, Eilon; Cohen, Jonathan; Cinnioglu, Cengiz; Underhill, Peter A.; Rosenberg, Noah A.; Hochrein, Jochen; Granka, Julie M.; Hillel, Hossi; Feldman, Marcus W. (2013). "Genetics and the History of the Samaritans: Y-Chromosomal Microsatellites and Genetic Affinity between Samaritans and Cohanim". Human Biology. 85 (6): 825–858. doi:10.3378/027.085.0601. PMID 25079122. S2CID 12701469.
- Patience, Martin (6 February 2007). "Ancient community seeks brides abroad". BBC News.
- Powell, Mark Allan (2009). Introducing the New Testament: A Historical, Literary, and Theological Survey. Baker Books. ISBN 978-1-441-20704-3.
- Pummer, Reinhard (1987). The Samaritans. Leiden: E. J. Brill. ISBN 978-9-004-07891-8.
- Pummer, Reinhard (1997). "Samaritan Synagogues and Jewish Synagogues: Similarities and Differences". In Fine, Steven (ed.). Jews, Christians, and Polytheists in the Ancient Synagogue. Routledge. pp. 118–160. ISBN 978-0-415-18247-8.
- Pummer, Reinhard (2002). Early Christian Authors on Samaritans and Samaritanism: Texts, Translations and Commentary. Mohr Siebeck. ISBN 978-3-161-47831-4.
- Pummer, Reinhard (2009). The Samaritans in Flavius Josephus. Mohr Siebeck. ISBN 978-3-161-50106-7.
- Pummer, Reinhard (2011). "The mosaic Tabernacle as the Legitimate Sanctuary of the Biblical Tabernacle in Samaritanism". In Fine, Steven (ed.). The Temple of Jerusalem: From Moses to the Messiah: In Honor of Professor Louis H. Feldman. BRILL. pp. 125–149. ISBN 978-9-004-19253-9.
- Pummer, Reinhard (2016). The Samaritans: A Profile. Wm. B. Eerdmans Publishing. ISBN 978-0-802-86768-1.
- Purvis, James D. (1968). The Samaritan Pentateuch and the Origin of the Samaritan Sect. Harvard Semitic Monographs. Vol. 2. Harvard University Press.
- Rosenblatt, Dana (14 October 2002). "Amid conflict, Samaritans keep unique identity". CNN.
- Sabella, Bernard (2011). "The Status of Non-Muslims in a Palestinian State". In Ahlstand, Kajsa; Gunner, Goran (eds.). Non-Muslims in Muslim Majority Societies: With Focus on the Middle East and Pakistan. ISD LLC. pp. 73–75. ISBN 978-0-718-84301-4.
- "Samaritan". Jerusalem Cinematheque – Israel Film Archive.
- "The Samaritan High Priests". The Samaritans.
- "The Samaritan Update". thesamaritanupdate.com. 5 June 2022.
- Schiffman, Lawrence H. (1991). From Text to Tradition: A History of Second Temple and Rabbinic Judaism. KTAV Publishing House. ISBN 978-0-881-25372-6.
- Schreiber, Monika (2014). The Comfort of Kin: Samaritan Community, Kinship, and Marriage. BRILL. ISBN 978-9-004-27425-9.
- Seeligmann, Isaac Leo (2004). The Septuagint Version of Isaiah and Cognate Studies. Mohr Siebeck. ISBN 978-3-161-48372-1.
- Sela, Shulamit (1994). "The Head of the Rabbanite, Karaite and Samaritan Jews: On the History of a Title". Bulletin of the School of Oriental and African Studies. 57 (2): 255–267. doi:10.1017/S0041977X00024848. JSTOR 620572. S2CID 162698361.
- Shen, P.; Lavi, T.; Kivisild, T.; Chou, V.; Sengun, D.; Gefel, D.; Shpirer, I.; Woolf, E.; Hillel, J.; Feldman, M.W.; Oefner, P.J. (2004). "Reconstruction of Patrilineages and Matrilineages of Samaritans and Other Israeli Populations From Y-Chromosome and Mitochondrial DNA Sequence Variation" (PDF). Human Mutation. 24 (3): 248–260. doi:10.1002/humu.20077. PMID 15300852. S2CID 1571356.
- Sivan, Hagith (2008). Palestine in late antiquity. Oxford University Press. ISBN 978-0-199-28417-7.
- Steinberg, Jessica (16 March 2017). "A former Samaritan faces the music of her complicated roots". The Times of Israel.
- Stern, Sacha (2018). Jewish Identity in Early Rabbinic Writings. BRILL. ISBN 978-9-004-33276-8.
- Talmon, Shemaryahu (2002). "Biblical Traditions in Samaritan History". In Stern, Ephraim; Eshel, Hanan (eds.). Sefer Ha-Shomronim (in Hebrew). Jerusalem: Ben Zvi Institute. pp. 25–27.
- Thomson, J. E. H. (1919). The Samaritans: Their Testimony to the Religion of Israel. Edinburgh & London: Oliver and Boyd.
- Tobolowsky, Andrew (2022). "The Tribes That Were Not Lost: The Samaritans". The Myth of the Twelve Tribes of Israel: New Identities Across Time and Space. Cambridge: Cambridge University Press. pp. 69–70, 73–75. doi:10.1017/9781009091435.003. ISBN 978-1-316-51494-8.
- "Topical Bible: Nakedness". Bible Hub.
- "Tourism". Archived from the original on 14 June 2008.
- Trümper, Monika (2020). "The Synagogue in Delos Revisited". In Doering, Lutz; Krause, Andrew R. (eds.). Synagogues in the Hellenistic and Roman Periods: Archaeological Finds, New Methods, New Theories. Vandenhoeck & Ruprecht. pp. 81–123. ISBN 978-3-525-52215-8.
- Tsedaka, Benyamim (31 December 2018). "Israelite Samaritan Families Today". Israelite Samaritan Information Institute.
- Tsedaka, Benyamim (1 May 2015). "Brazil". Israelite Samaritan Information Institute.
- Tsedaka, Benyamim; Sullivan, Sharon, eds. (2013). The Israelite Samaritan Version of the Torah: First English Translation Compared with the Masoretic Version. Grand Rapids, Michigan / Cambridge: Wm. B. Eerdmans Publishing. ISBN 978-1-467-46454-3.
- VanderKam, James; Flint, Peter (2005). The Meaning of the Dead Sea Scrolls: Their Significance For Understanding the Bible, Judaism, Jesus, and Christianity (2nd ed.). A&C Black. ISBN 978-0-567-08468-2.
- White, L. Michael (April 1987). "The Delos Synagogue Revisited Recent Fieldwork in the Graeco–Roman Diaspora". Harvard Theological Review. 80 (2): 133–160. doi:10.1017/S0017816000023579. JSTOR 1509604. S2CID 162810274.
- Yousef, Hussein Ahmad; Barghouti, Iyad (24 January 2005). "The Political History of the Samaritans: Minority under Occupation: The Socio politics of the Samaritans in the Palestinian Occupied Territories". Zajel. Archived from the original on 19 January 2012.
- Zertal, Adam (November 1989). "The Wedge-Shaped Decorated Bowl and the Origin of the Samaritans". Bulletin of the American Schools of Oriental Research (276): 77–84. doi:10.2307/1356853. JSTOR 1356853. S2CID 163900813.
- Zertal, Adam (30 November 2007). The Manasseh Hill Country Survey, Volume 2: The Eastern Valleys and the Fringes of the Desert. Brill. pp. 55, 63, 90. ISBN 978-90-474-2387-4.
- Zsengellér, József (June 2017). "The Samaritan Diaspora in Antiquity". Acta Antiqua. 56 (2): 157–175. doi:10.1556/068.2016.56.2.2. S2CID 166167208 – via ResearchGate.
