= Sofi Tsedaka =

Israeli actress and singer (born 1975)

- סופי צדקה
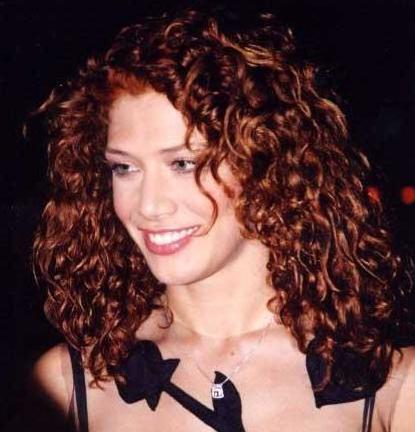
- Tsedaka in the 1990s
- Born: 26 October 1975 (age 50); Holon, Israel
- Other name: Sofi Sarah (סופי שרה)
- Occupations: Singer; actress
- Political party: The Greens (2006)
- Spouse: Roni Azran (m. 1997; div. 2002)
- Children: 2

Sofi Tsedaka (Hebrew: סופי צדקה; born 26 October 1975), also known as Sofi Sarah (סופי שרה), is an Israeli singer and actress.

She has acted and sung on various television shows and children's video cassettes throughout her career and has also released several musical singles on Israeli radio. Tsedaka voiced the character Ella of Frell (played by American actress Anne Hathaway) in the Hebrew dubbing of the 2004 film Ella Enchanted. In 2017, she produced a documentary about her experience with leaving the Samaritan community and adopting Judaism. She has also released a religious CD track titled Bereshet (בְּרֵאשִׁית, Bərēšīṯ), which contains the initial verses of the Samaritan Pentateuch.

== Early and personal life ==
Tsedaka is originally a Samaritan from the city of Holon, where she was born in 1975. Although the Chief Rabbinate of Israel recognizes Samaritans as ethnically Jewish (i.e., Israelite), the historic question of the community's Halakhic Jewishness has been controversial. At the age of 18, she initiated her conversion to Judaism, along with her sisters. Her given name is Sofi, a name her father intended to reflect her status as the last of his daughters (sof, lit. "end" in Hebrew; sofi, lit. "final"); when she finalized her conversion, she was asked to take a Jewish name in addition, which she did in adopting the second name "Sarah" (שָׂרָה). Later, after becoming fully Jewish at the age of 21, she married Roni Azran, an Israeli Jew. The couple had a daughter in 1997 before divorcing in 2002. Tsedaka also has a son, born in 2011.

== Political career ==
In the 2006 Israeli legislative elections for the 17th Knesset, Tsedaka stood for The Greens, but was not elected.

== See also ==
- List of converts to Judaism
