= Progressive Student Labor Front =

Progressive Student Labor Front (Arabic: جبهة العمل الطلابي التقدمية) is a Palestinian student organization. It is politically linked to the Popular Front for the Liberation of Palestine.
