= Languages of Palestine =

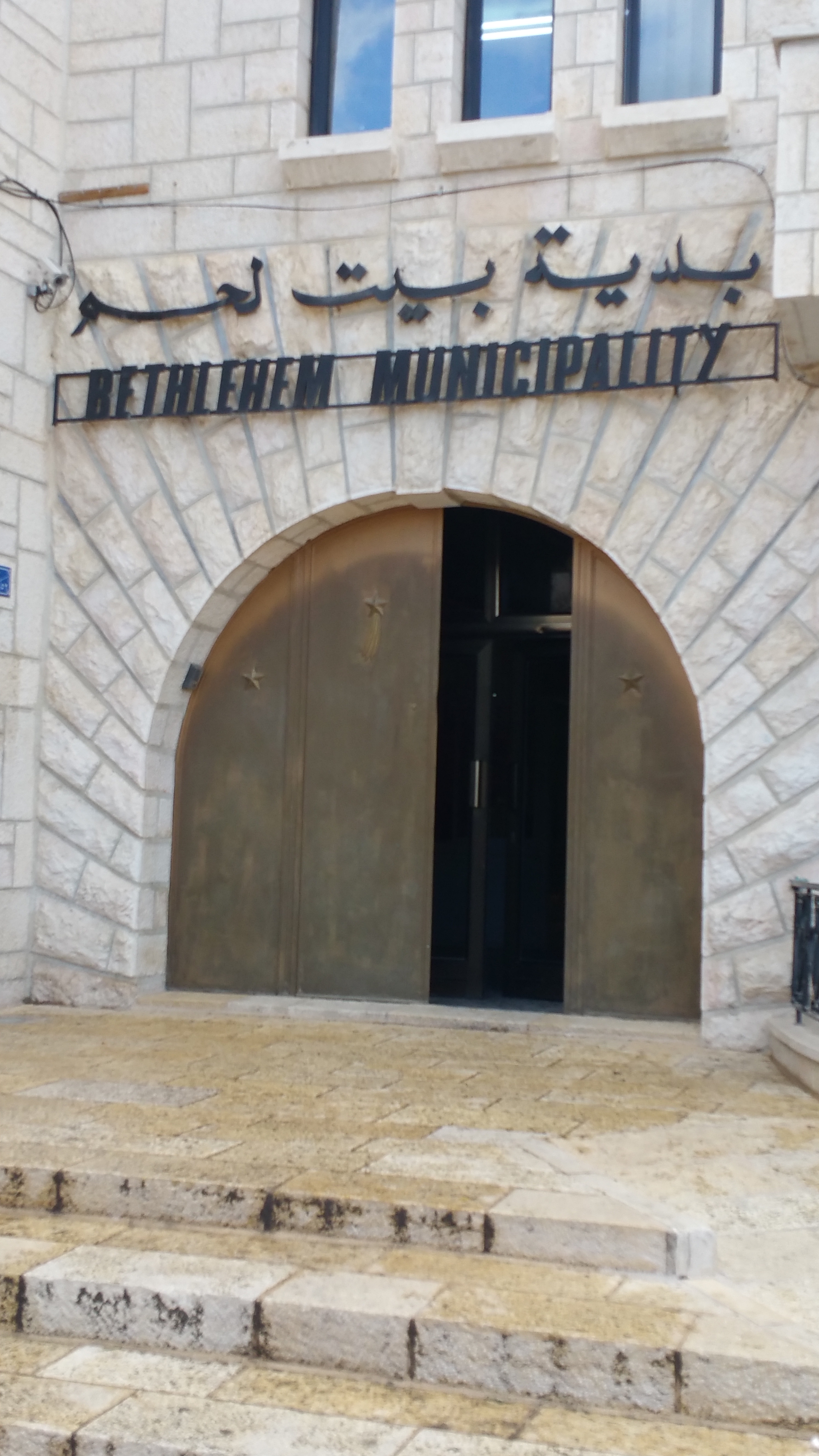
- Bethlehem municipality building signage in Arabic and English
- Official: Arabic
- Recognised: Modern Hebrew
- Vernacular: Palestinian Arabic, Northwest Arabian Arabic (South Levantine Bedawi Arabic)
- Minority: Armenian, Domari, Samaritan Aramaic, Samaritan Hebrew
- Foreign: English, French
- Signed: Levantine Arabic Sign Language
- Keyboard layout: Arabic keyboard

The majority of the population of the State of Palestine and Palestinians write in the Arabic language and use a Palestinian Arabic dialect for daily communication. The Palestinian Basic Law designates Arabic as the official language of the state, of legislation, administration, and the courts, though several other languages are also used in the educational sphere, both presently and historically. There are minority language groups, and this, in addition to fairly widespread general knowledge of English and/or Modern Hebrew, as well as the diglossic nature of Arabic, means multilingualism is common.

Multilingualism and diglossia are longstanding features of the linguistic atmosphere historically-speaking as well, especially among elite and educated classes. The region's location as a crossroads ruled by various empires who brought different languages of administration and people to oversee and inhabit the land throughout its history, has contributed to its rich linguistic profile. (Note: Bassal (2012):"Former peoples and cultures found in Palestine in past centuries had an impact, directly or indirectly, on the linguistic profile of Palestine. One of the earliest elements making a significant mark on Palestinian Arab dialects is the Aramaic layer.") The influence of the Aramaic language in particular, which was used as both a lingua franca and a koine in Palestine and the wider region for some 1500 years (c. 7th/6th centuries BC – 9th/10th centuries CE) can be seen in the Palestinian Arabic dialects spoken by the majority of Palestinians in the West Bank and Gaza and beyond.

The Palestinian Arabic vernacular is also part of a continuum of mutually intelligible dialects known as Levantine or "Syro-Palestinian" Arabic that each contain several subtypes that can cross-cut political boundaries (as with the urban, or Levantine Bedawi Arabic subtypes), but can also be entirely unique (as in the case of localized village dialects). Further, in its broadest definitions, the historical territory of the region of Palestine now lies in multiple countries, and the Palestinian people themselves have been dispersed by the partition of Palestine and the Nakba, making cross-border linguistic analysis essential to understanding the languages' development and variation.

== Historical overview ==
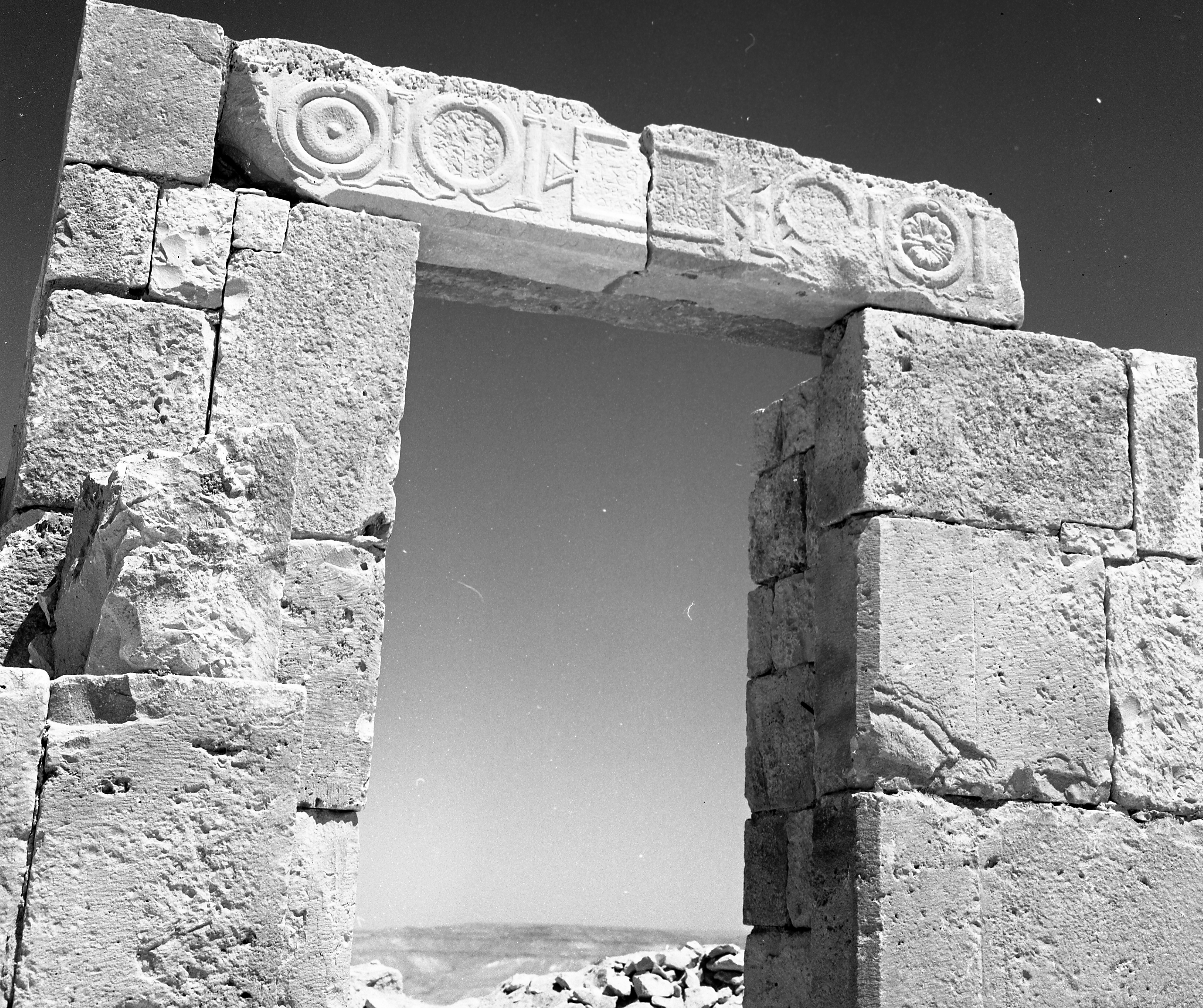
Stone lintel of the Nabataean temple in Avdat with a Koine Greek rededication inscription dated to the third century that includes three Nabataean Arabic names, the architect Zamnos, Soaidos and Nakebos, "all friends of Obodas"

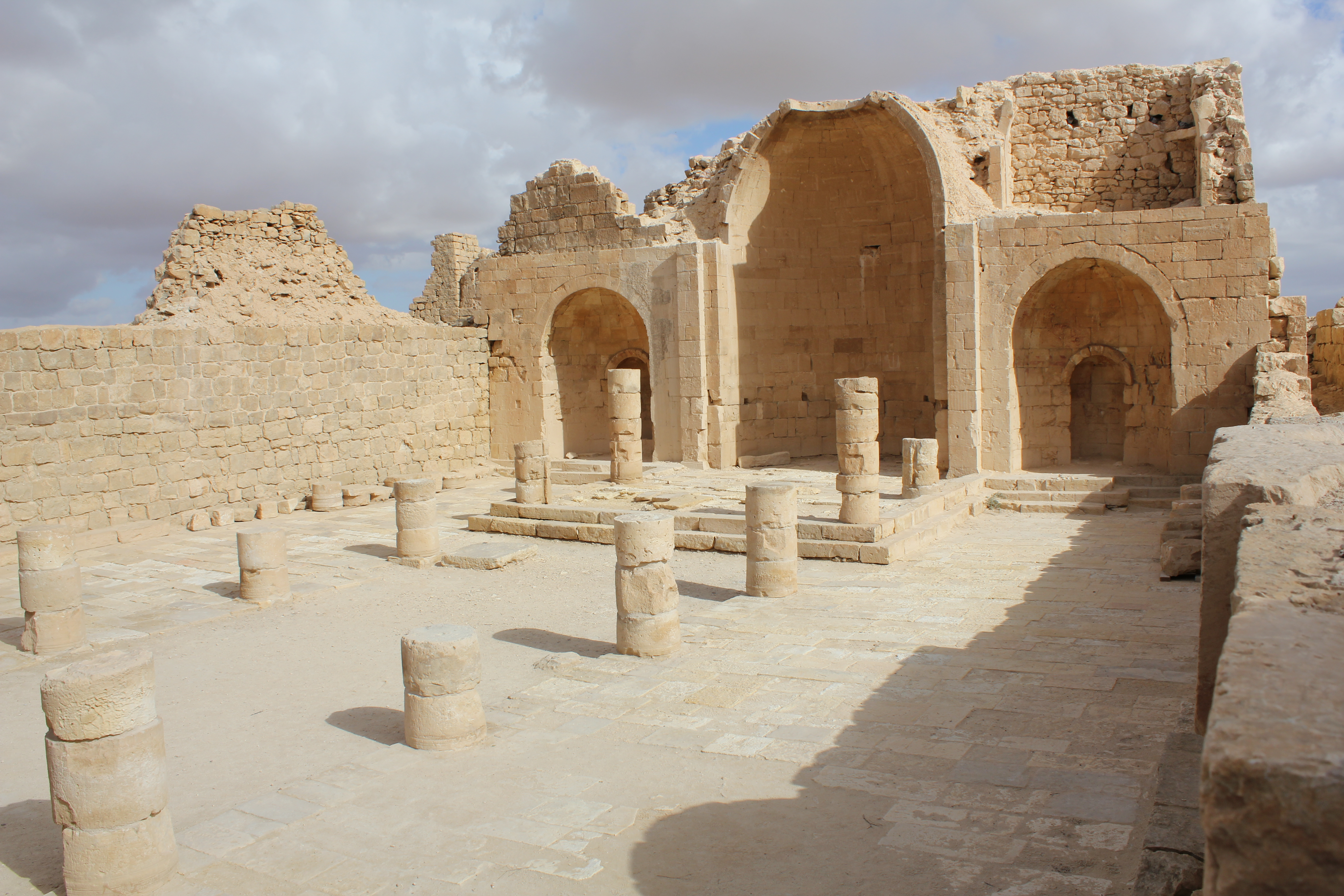
Ruins of the Byzantine era monastery in ancient Nessana where papyri composed in four languages/scripts (Greek, Syriac, Arabic and Latin) were discovered

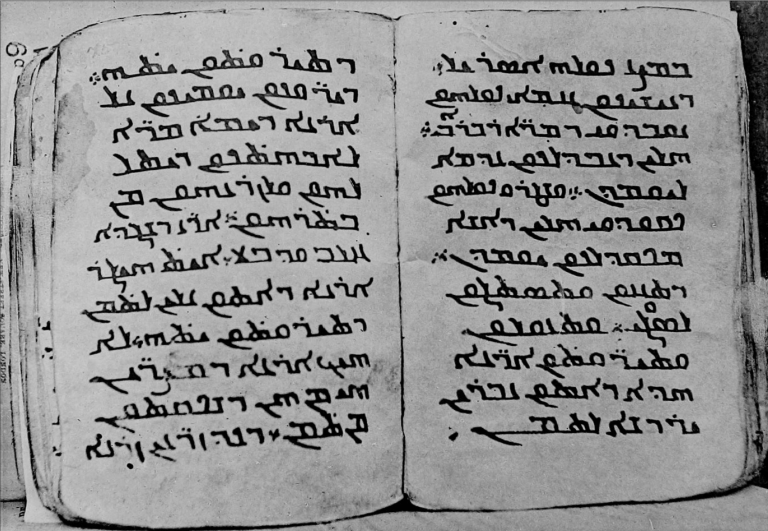
Christian Palestinian Aramaic manuscript of Deuteronomy 11:7–10 from the Lewis lectionary, 11th century (Westminster College, Cambridge)

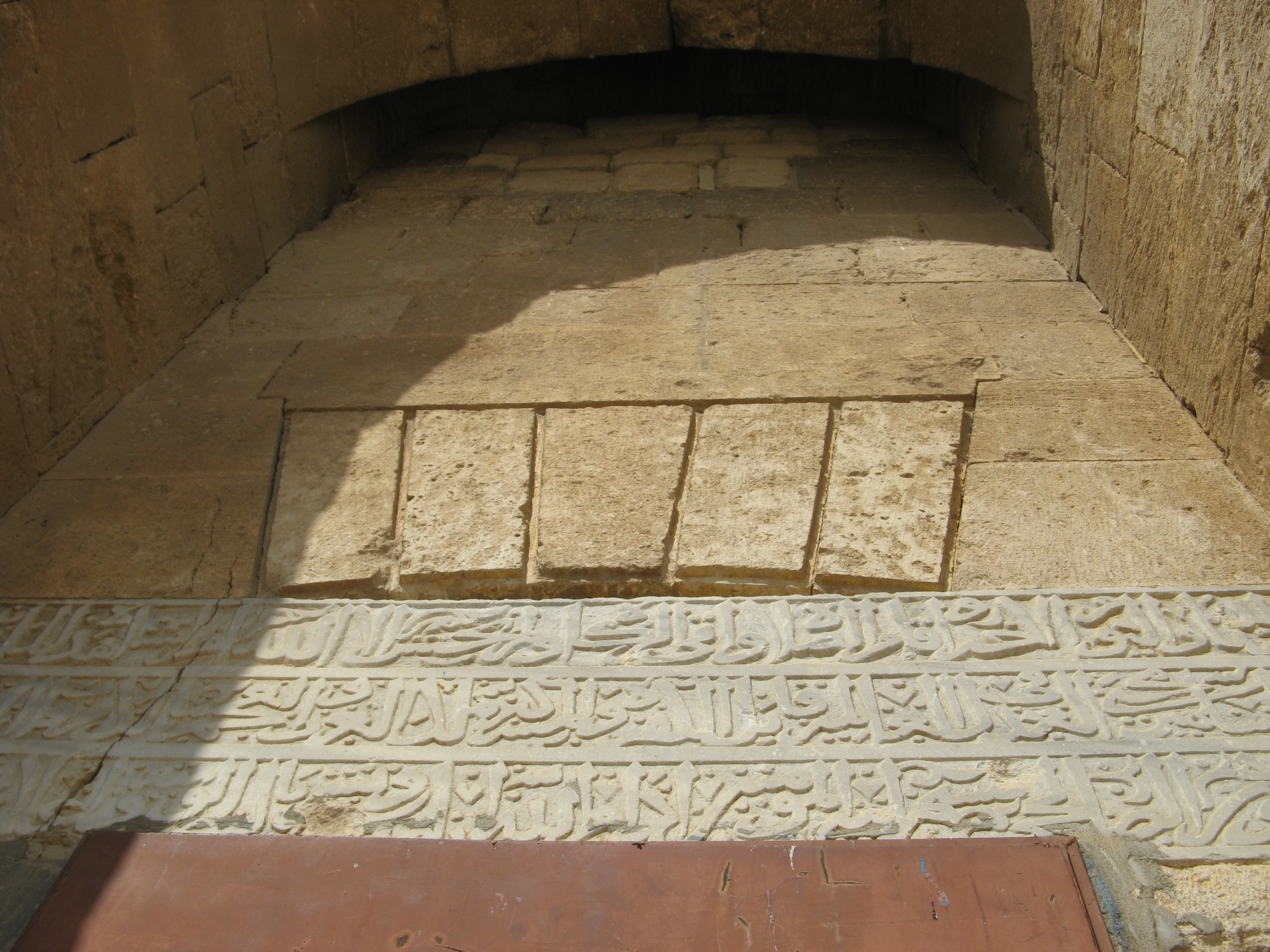
Arabic inscription on the White Tower, the minaret of the Umayyad-era White Mosque of Ramle

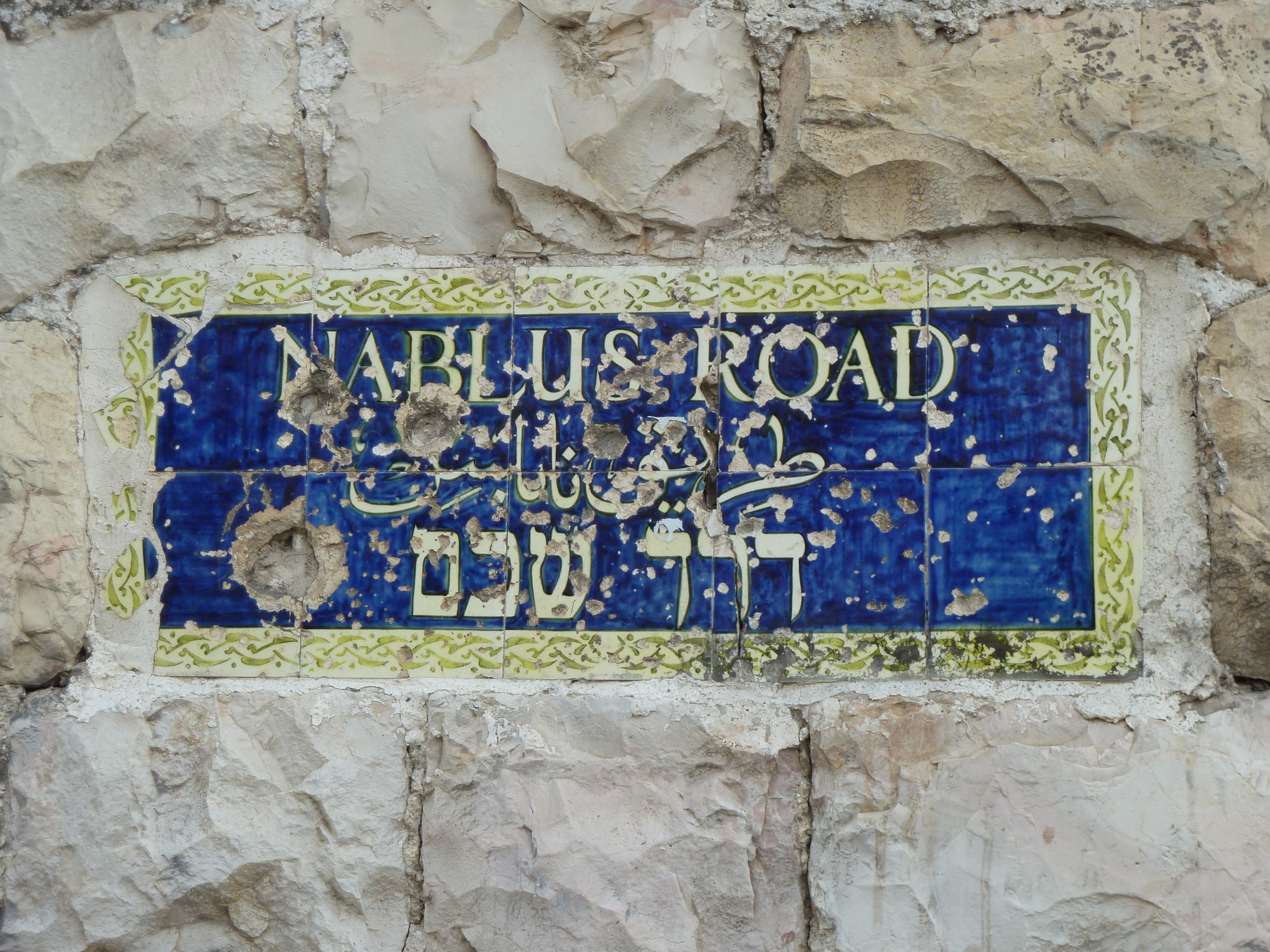
Trilingual sign for the road leading from the Old City of Jerusalem to Nablus from the time of British rule of Mandatory Palestine, from top to bottom: English, Arabic, and Modern Hebrew

Reviewing some of the history of language use and development in Palestine is essential to understanding its current linguistic profile. (Note: Thompson (2019): "The earliest known languages of Palestine belong to the Afro-Asiatic language family, originating perhaps as early as 10,000 BCE, with a history of inscriptions going back as early as the beginning of the 4th millennium BCE. Many Afro-Asiatic inscriptions dating from the Early and Middle Bronze Ages in ancient Egyptian, Early West Semitic and Akkadian reflect a geographical displacement from the Nile Valley into Palestine and Syria and finally to Southern Mesopotamia. Pottery finds from Arabia Felix suggest the spread of Early West Semitic influence from Palestine at the very end of the Early Bronze Age: a development, which is first reflected in inscriptions in Old South Arabic late in the first millennium BCE. By the Late Bronze Age, Early West Semitic distinguished itself in Syria and Palestine variously between Aramaic, Ugaritic and Phoenician (so-called 'Canaanite'). This development, which, in the course of the Iron Age, developed a considerable number of dialect variations, such as Israelite, Ammonite, Moabite, Edomite and Judahite (including the literary language of biblical Hebrew by the 5th century BCE). Palestine also witnessed the early use of linguae francae such as Akkadian in the Late Bronze Age, Aramaic in the late Iron Age and Persian periods and Greek from the 3rd century BCE.) This history stretches back to very beginnings of written language, and includes several ancient Semitic languages. Of relevance here is the process by which the region of Palestine went from being a predominantly Aramaic-speaking population to an Arabic-speaking one, which took place by means of a gradual language shift over several centuries following the Muslim conquest of Syria, and included phases of Aramaic-Arabic (and Aramaic-Hebrew (Note: During the Greek and Roman period, the primary language of Palestinian Jews was also Aramaic (see Jewish Palestinian Aramaic), a Semitic language closely related to Hebrew. (E.P. Sanders, Jaroslav Jan Pelikan (2015). Encyclopedia Britannica))) bilingualism, both before and afterward. By the 2nd century CE, Old Hebrew had ceased to be a spoken language, though its biblical form continued to used in liturgical practice.

Ancient varieties of Arabic, such as Ancient North Arabian, were already in use among some of the inhabitants of Palestine centuries prior to the Muslim conquest. The Nabataeans, for example, whose kingdom (c. 3rd century BC - 106 CE) extended into the south of Palestine were speakers of both Nabataean Aramaic and Nabataean Arabic, a form of Old Arabic, which they transcribed using a modified Imperial Aramaic script, that eventually birthed the Arabic alphabet. One of the oldest examples of Arabic poetry was transcribed in Nabataean script and discovered in Ein Avdat in the Negev. Following the annexation of their kingdom and its incorporation into the Roman province of Arabia Petraea (and later Palaestina Salutaris), bilingual Greek-Nabataean inscriptions proliferate, as Koine Greek replaced Aramaic as the lingua franca and koine.

Diglossia and multilingualism have therefore long been a feature of the Palestinian linguistic landscape, and that of the Ancient Near East in general, particularly among the elite classes. In Byzantine and Umayyad-era Nessana, for example, the Arabic-speaking population left behind papyri composed in Greek, Syriac, Arabic and Latin. (Note: Masalha (2022), pp. 23-24: "Private letters, texts and documents written on more than 600 papyri sheets and preserved in papyri archives (with some Arabic papyrus documents dating to Umayyad Palestine in AD 672–89) were also discovered in 1936 in the Naqab (southern Palestine), showing not only bilingualism or diglossia – the use of two languages or two dialects by a single language community – but also multilingualism (Latin and Greek included) in Byzantine Nessana. The native language of Nessana was Arabic, while Greek was the standard language of education; the Greek papyri documents of Nessana also included official Byzantine letters, documents and private wills as well as fragmentary text from Virgil's work and a Latin-Greek glossary of his Aeneid, an epic poem written in the first century BC (Colt 1962; Hoyland 2015: 65–6; Magness 2003: vol. 1; Shahid 1989: 143). This vocabulary list for the Aeneid was used by local schoolboys in a local school at Nessana and in elementary schools in Palestine in the early sixth century (Evans 2005: 22). Furthermore, fourth-century documents and letters mention the names of sophists and rhetors who also taught in other schools of rhetoric in Palestine (Gaza, Caesarea-Maritima, Elusa and Aelia Capitolina), some of which had chairs in rhetoric. In the Naqab town of Elusa (whose name was preserved in the modern Naqab Arab village al-Khalasa until 1948), located to the south-west of Beersheba, maintained a school and an official teacher of rhetoric (Hidary 2017: 6). Joined together into a scroll, an early form of a book, the Nessana papyrus letters and documents show that papyrus writings in Greek, Syriac and Arabic continued into early Islam and Umayyad Palestine.") Late phase bilingualism in the gradual language shift from Aramaic to Arabic is readily apparent in the texts composed by Palestinian Christian scholars in the 9th and 10th centuries in a form of Middle Arabic classified as Ancient South Palestinian, which were often translations of Syriac or Greek biblical/liturgical texts, and even when originally composed in Arabic reveal a strong Aramaic/Syriac substratum (see also Christian Palestinian Aramaic). Another distinctive form of Middle Arabic is Samaritan Arabic, which emerged from within the last indigenous community in Palestine to complete the language shift, the Samaritans, for whom Arabic became their dominant and perhaps sole vernacular only in the 11th century, using Samaritan Aramaic (and Samaritan Hebrew) today largely for liturgical/textual purposes.

Other ancient languages that influenced Arabic and contemporary Palestinian Arabic (and Levantine Arabic) dialects are Canaanite, Classical Hebrew (Biblical and Mishnaic), Persian, Classical Greek (Koine) and Latin. In the modern era, as a result of centuries of Ottoman rule (1516-1917), European interventions, and the Mandate for Palestine, components of the Turkish language, as well as English, French, German and Italian have also been incorporated into the Arabic language and common speech. Additionally, as a result of Zionist immigration and the establishment of Israel, Modern Hebrew, revived as part of the Zionist project, has imprinted upon the general linguistic environment.

== Languages ==
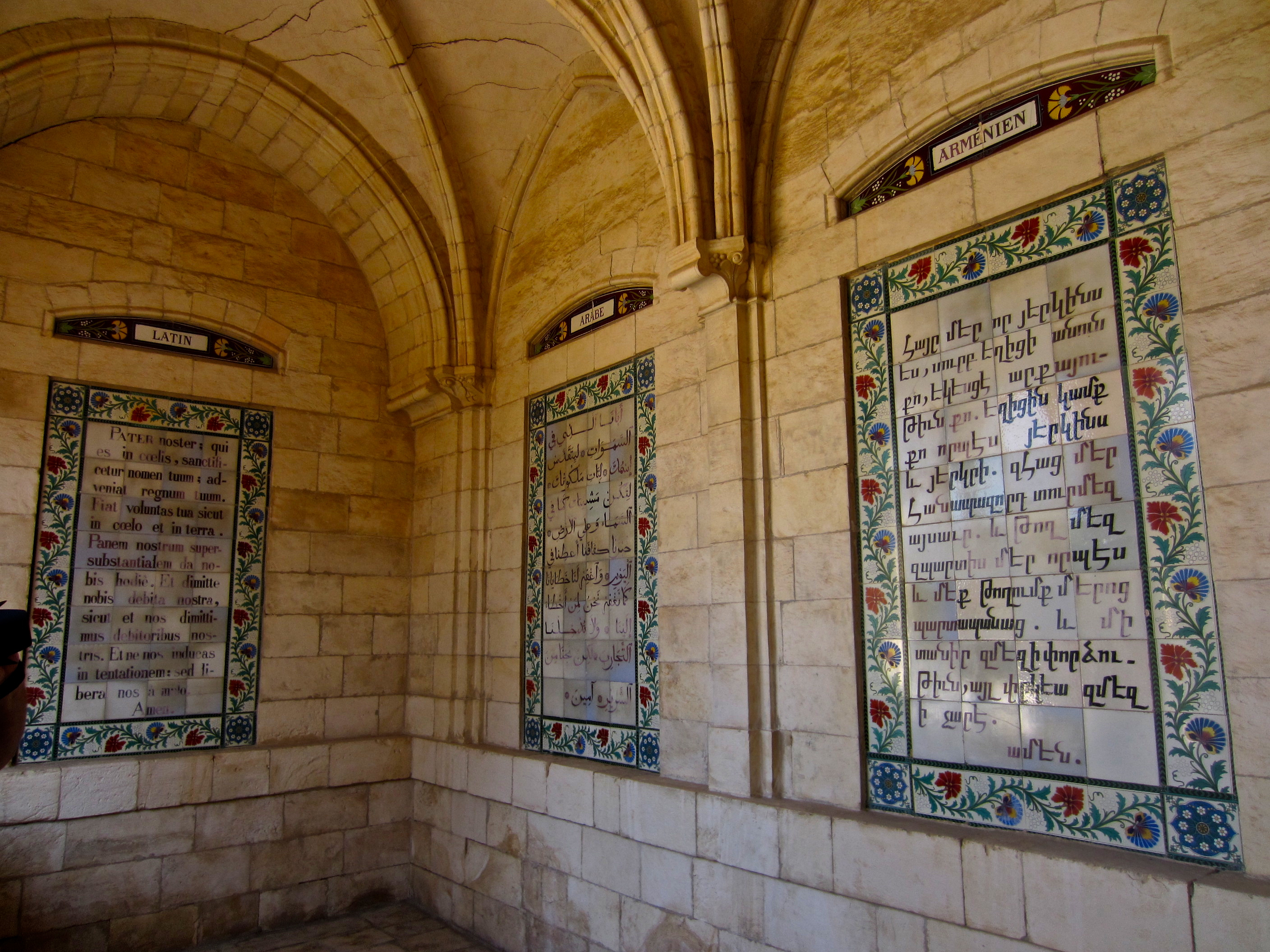
The Lord's Prayer (from left to right) in Latin, Arabic and Armenian, among many others, displayed at the Church of the Pater Noster on the Mount of Olives, part of the French National Domain in the Holy Land

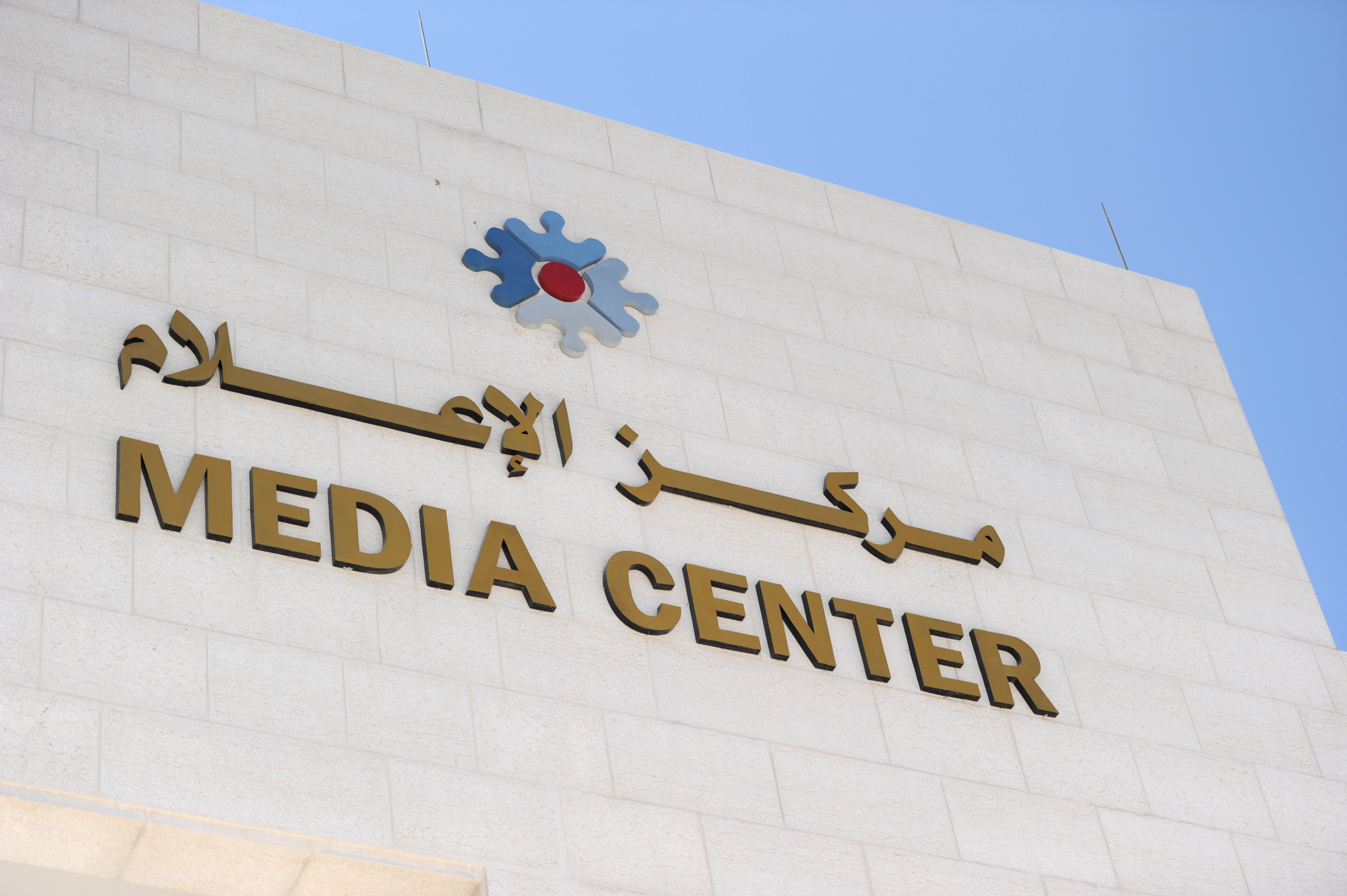
Bilingual signage of the Media Center of An-Najah University in Nablus, Arabic at top, English below

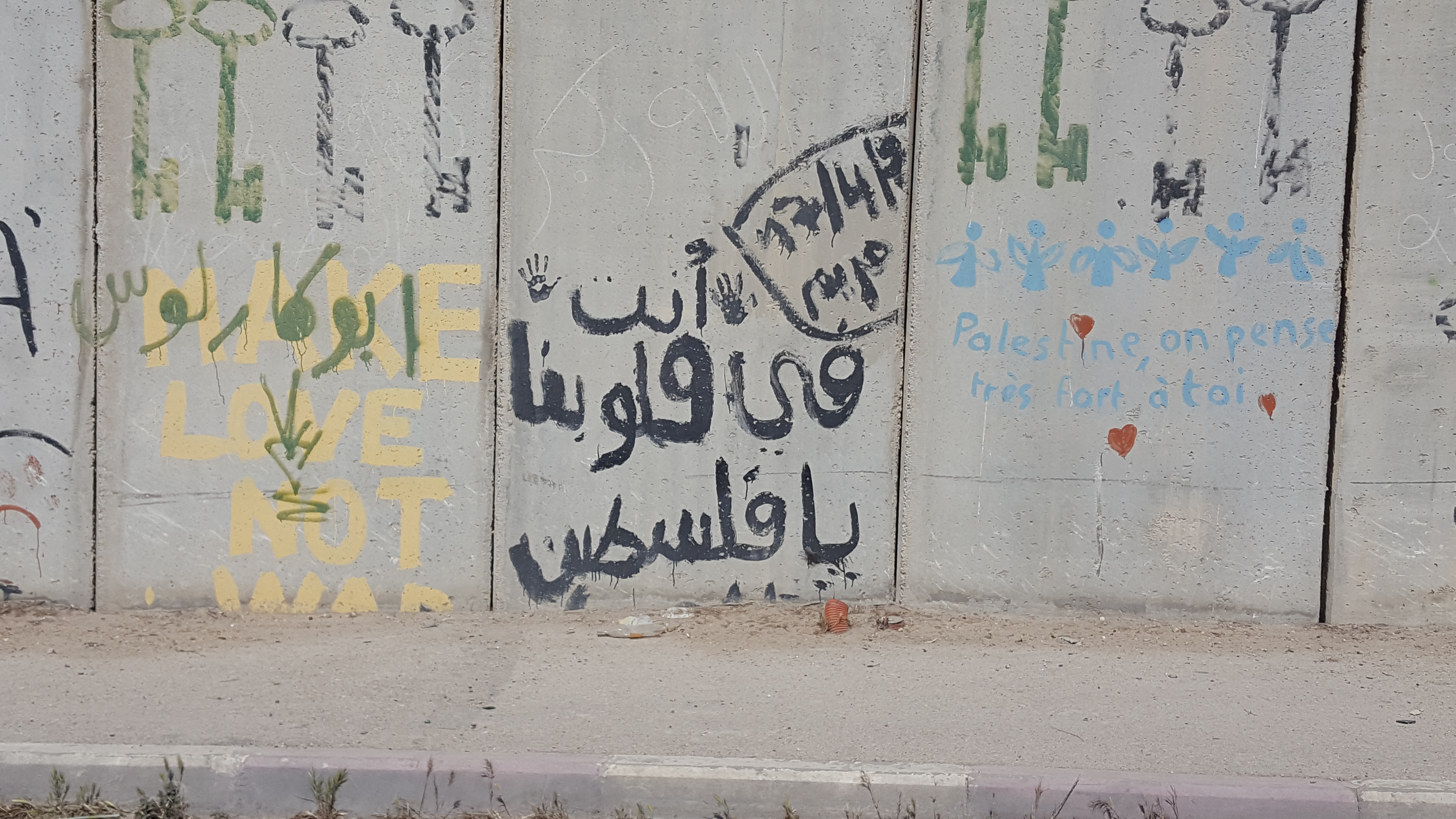
Graffiti in English, Arabic and French on the Separation wall in Abu Dis

While Arabic is the primary and dominant language in use in the State of Palestine, other languages are known and used by many, due to their use in educational institutions and workplaces, or as a result of immigration, tourism, and travel. Primary among these, as in the case in much of the world, is knowledge of English, and this is especially true of younger generations due to their use of social media. In addition, there is exposure to and some knowledge of modern Hebrew, as well as European languages like French, Spanish, German and Italian. There are also languages used or spoken by small minority communities who have inhabited Palestine for several generations, or even millennia, such as Samaritan, Armenian, Assyrian, Abyssinian, and Coptic, though use of these languages is generally restricted to their respective communities who are centered in cities like Nablus, the Old City of Jerusalem and Bethlehem, and in some cases is largely confined to liturgical purposes.

=== Official status and language policy ===
The Palestinian Basic Law designates Arabic as the official language of the State of Palestine, and Arabic is the language of legislation, administration, and the courts. The New Palestinian Curriculum instituted following the Oslo Accords (which granted the newly formed Palestinian National Authority control over education in the Occupied Palestinian Territories), includes an internationally oriented approach to language instruction. Arabic language instruction remains the main focus to maintain communication with the countries of the region, for which Arabic is also the primary language of communication. However, there is also a focus on English instruction, as an international language of communication, as well as Modern Hebrew, in order to be able to address the reality of required interaction with Israel.

=== Arabic and Palestinian Arabic ===
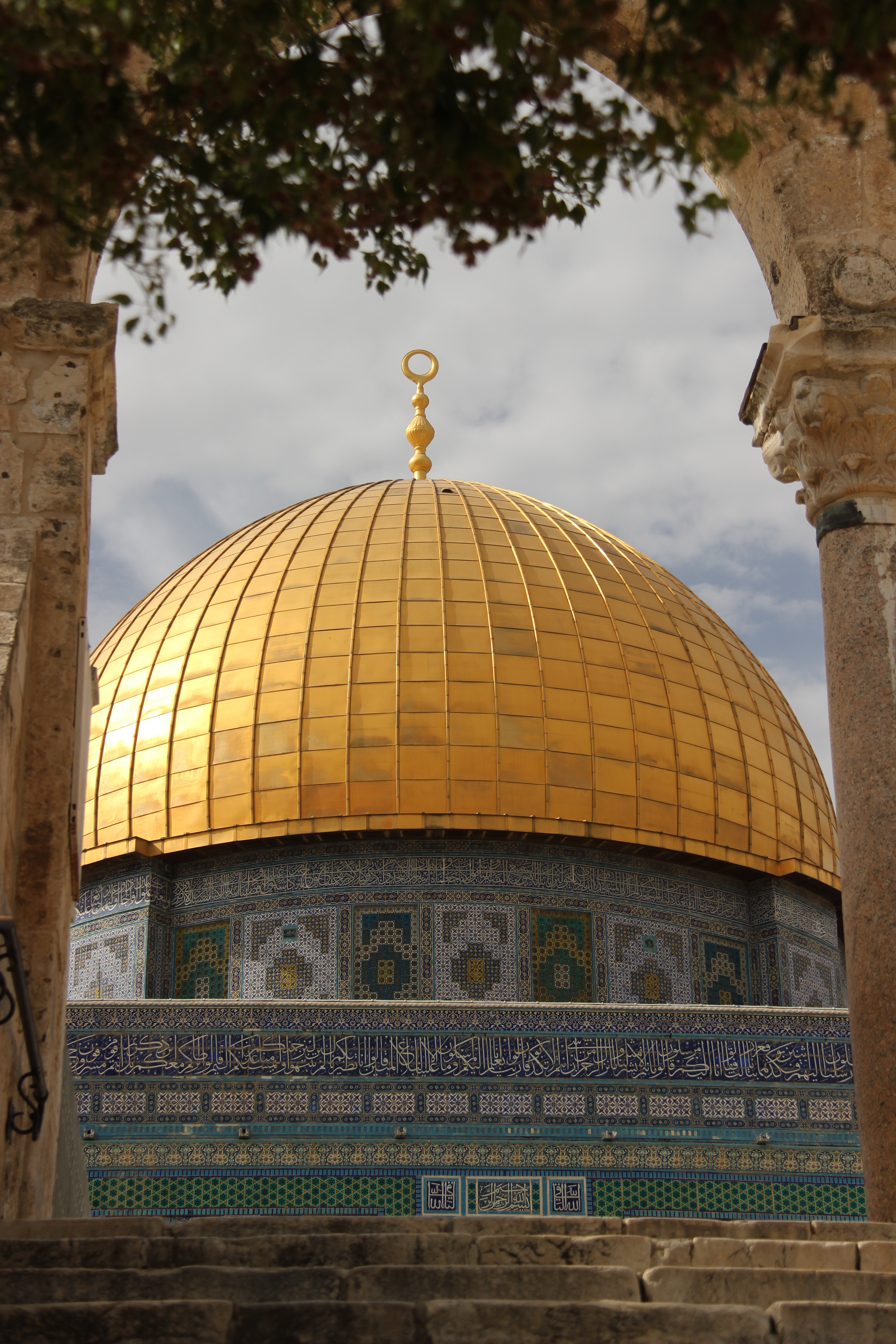
The tilework on the Dome of the Rock in the Old City of Jerusalem below the golden dome and all around the top of the square structure upon which it sits is Arabic calligraphy quoting surahs from the Quran

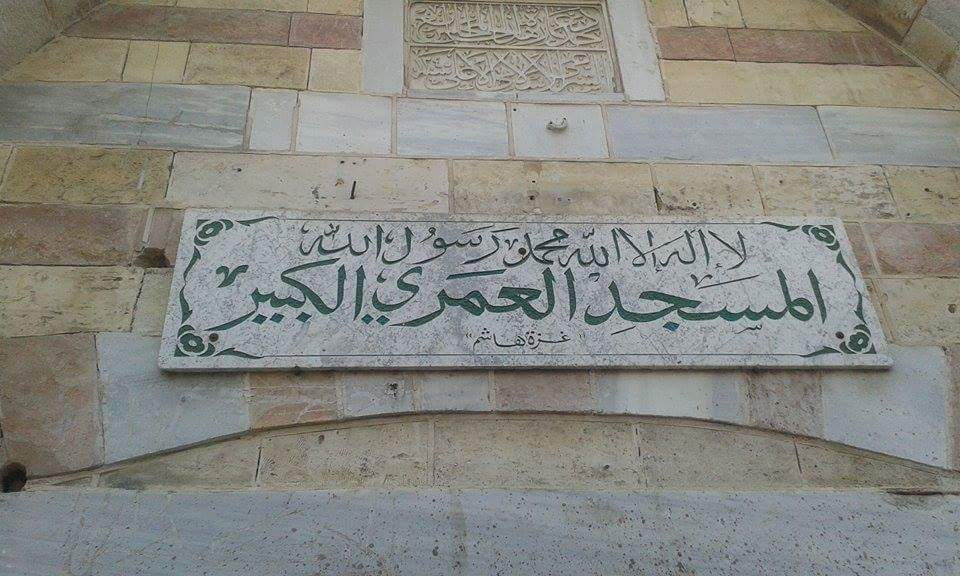
Stone inscription of Quranic passage and Arabic sign above the entrance to the Great Omari Mosque in Gaza City, it reads: "There is no god but God and Muhammad is his Prophet, The Great Omari Mosque, Ghazzat Hashem"

Arabic is a diglossic language, whereby there is a "high" or standard form (closely related to the Classical Arabic of the Quran) used primarily for writing, and various "low" or colloquial forms used to communicate in daily life. This diglossic use of two different varieties of the same general language group has been characterized as a kind of bilingualism.

The spoken form used by Palestinians is Palestinian Arabic which is a Levantine dialect that cannot be fully understood within modern political borders alone. Typically, 'national' varieties of Arabic are characterized by internal diversity with several sub-varieties, or what scholars have termed "ecolinguistic" varieties, of three main types: urban, rural (fellahi), and Bedouin (badawi). Urban varieties are associated with major cities such as Jerusalem, Hebron, Nablus, Gaza City, and Ramallah, and share much in common with the urban Levantine Arabic varieties spoken in Syrian and Lebanese cities, as well as Palestinians urban-dwellers elsewhere in the region. Bedouin dialects, which are closer to those of Arabia are spoken among Palestinian bedouin communities, especially in the southern West Bank and Gaza, and among Galilee and Negev Bedouins and those of Sinai, Egypt and beyond. Rural dialects spoken in villages are the most localized, diverse, and unique, with some retaining very conservative and classical elements, while others deviate exhibiting patterned changes from classical pronunciation in selected phonemes. Speakers of Palestinian Arabic are religiously diverse and include Muslims, Druze, Samaritans, Jews, and Christians of various denominations.

The continued influence and use of Aramaic in the Palestinian Arabic spoken today is most obvious upon the vocabulary used in villages in the Galilee in what is now the north of Israel; however, there are also grammatical constructions used both there, and among Palestinians in the West Bank and Gaza, such as the use of la as an object marker ("e.g. Smi 'tu la-axük ? (did you hear your brother?)"), a usage extant in Arabic translations of the Peshitta, the Syriac version of Bible. (Note: Bassal (2012), p. 91:"As an example we can note the use of la as an object marker. In his comprehensive article about la and its occurrence as an object marker, Levin24 summarizes that the occurrence in the Arabic dialects is usually attributed to an Aramaic substratum. e.g. Smi 'tu la-axük ? (did you hear your brother?). In Aramaic the use of la is limited to definite objects.25 There is evidence of la as an object marker in texts that are rendered from Aramaic, especially in Christian Arabic texts from the south of Palestine. Blau also notes that in Christian Arabic texts rendered from the Syriac we can discern this use of la as an object marker.26 Furthermore I have cited some samples of la as an object marker in the Arabic Bible translations from Syriac.") There is also some Aramaic vocabulary influence that is not localized, that relates to agriculture and household items tied to ancient practices. For example, the term dafūra, which is used to describe the first figs to ripen, instead of the more general terms for figs tīn. In the Jewish Aramaic Mishnah texts it is used to refer to trees that bear fruit twice a year, and can be used in Palestinian Arabic to refer to the first harvest of a biseasonal crop as well, though the more common meaning was for the first ripe figs. Many of these terms are becoming less commonly used as Palestinians of the younger generations lose their lived connection to land and traditional practices.

=== Armenian ===
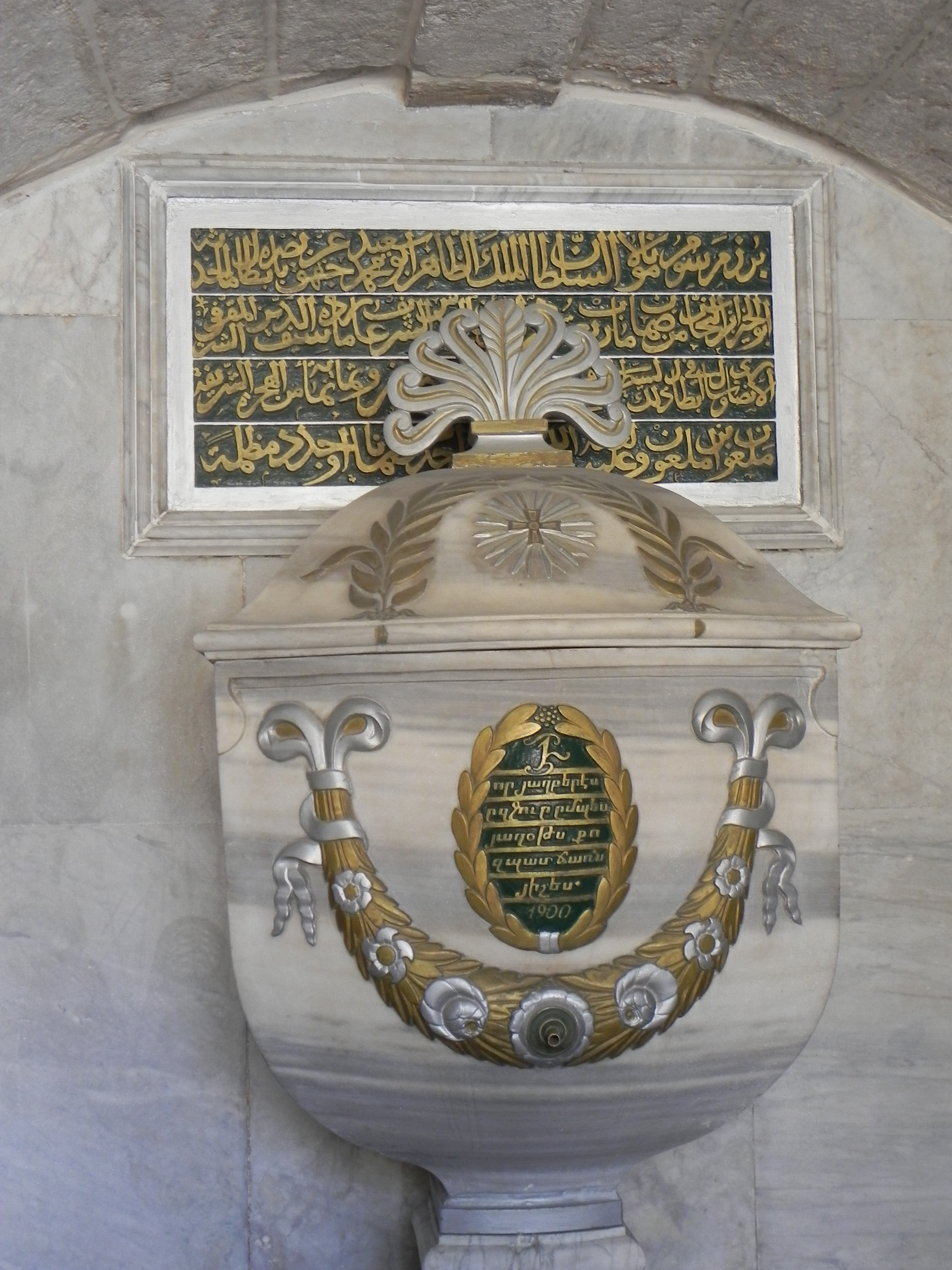
Font at the seminary of the Armenian Patriarchate of Jerusalem, with text in Arabic (top) and Armenian (below)

Armenian is a significant minority language in Palestine, as Armenians have inhabited in the region since the 4th century AD, considered to be one of the oldest Armenian communities outside of Armenia. Their presence slowly and steadily increased throughout the Early Islamic period, as members of their community came to perform pilgrimages and ended up staying, as attested in multiple references to Armenian churches and monasteries in textual sources from the 9th and 10th centuries. Around 2,000-3,000 Armenians lived in Palestine circa World War I, with the population peaking at over 10,000 prior to the 1948 war. The headquarters of the Armenian Patriarchate of Jerusalem is based in the Old City of Jerusalem, and the majority of Armenians in Palestine reside in the Armenian Quarter, but historically have also lived in Haifa, Jaffa, and Nazareth, with a small Armenian community also in Ramallah. Currently, the Jerusalem-Armenian population has declined, reducing the amount of Armenian speakers in their communities and greater region.

=== Assyrian/Syriac ===
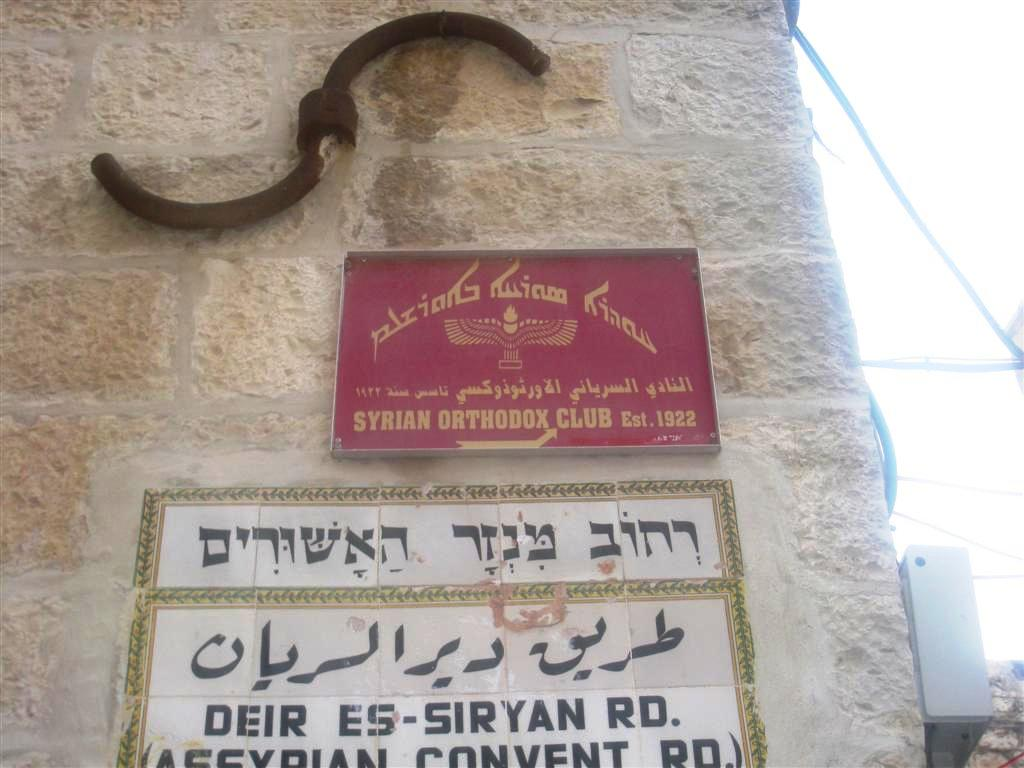
Syrian Orthodox Club signage in the Old City of Jerusalem. The script at the top of the red sign is a Syriac language script called estrangelo, followed by Arabic and English. The street sign below has Modern Hebrew added to the top, followed by Arabic and English

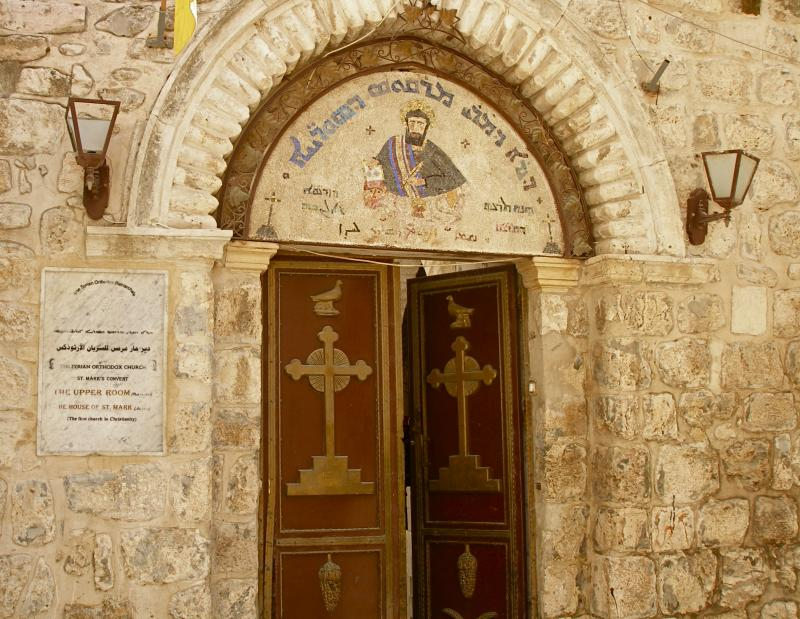
St. Mark's Convent, Syrian Orthodox Church in Jerusalem. The main sign above the door is in estrangelo Syriac script. The marble sign to the left trilingual: English, Syriac, Arabic.

The Assyrian/Syriac community in Palestine is centered in Bethlehem and are primarily descendants of Assyrians or Syriac Christians who came to perform pilgrimage in the late 19th and early 20th centuries and decided to stay or were unable to return to their home villages in the region due to Sayfo. The initial arrivals spoke dialects of Surayth, a Central Neo-Aramaic language, associated with their home villages (like Azech). With time, their use of these village dialects has receded, and the majority predominantly use Arabic for daily life, though many of the elders continue to converse in Surayth and consume media in that language.

The Syriac Orthodox Church also has a Patriarchal Vicariate of Jerusalem and Jordan located in the Armenian Quarter of Jerusalem and the faithful belonging to this church tradition use Western Aramaic languages in their liturgical practices.

=== Coptic ===
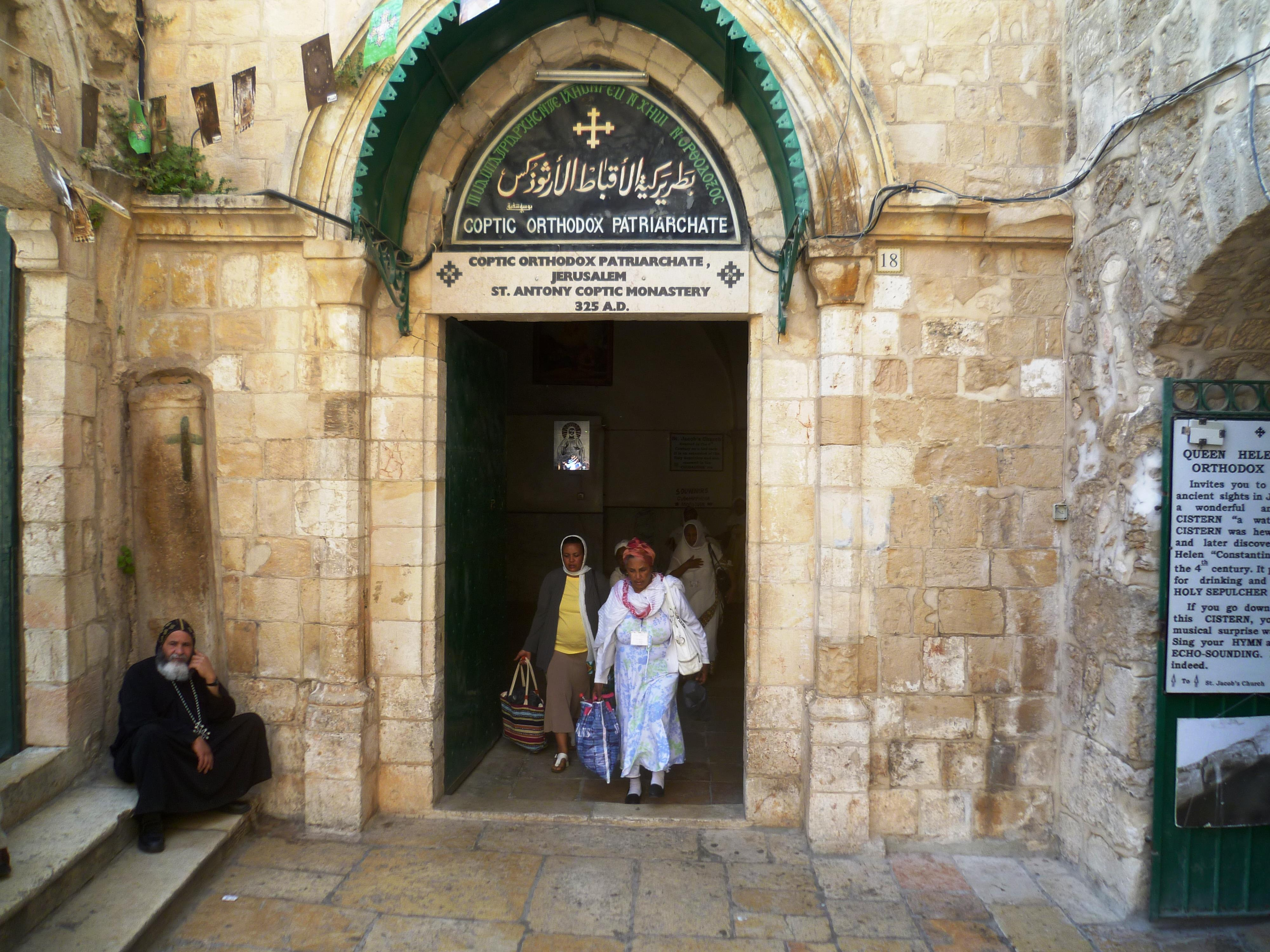
Trilingual sign of the Saint Antony Coptic Monastery in Jerusalem, with the name in Coptic script at top in green, followed by Arabic in gold, and English in white

The Coptic community in Palestine is quite small, but with a long history similar to that of the Armenians, gradually increasing over time due to continuous pilgrimages from Egypt. Egyptian monks, like Isaiah the Solitary (d. 491) were in regular contact and communion with the early Palestinian Christians of Gaza, like Hilarion (291-371) and Procopius of Gaza (c. 465-c. 528) The Coptic Orthodox Church has had a metropolitan diocese headquartered in Jerusalem since at least the 13th century, and the majority of the Coptic faithful, numbering between 60 and 80 families, live in that city or in Ramallah.

Copts speak colloquial Arabic dialects, like Egyptian Arabic, natively, and for those who have lived in Palestine for generations, they speak the Palestinian Arabic dialect without difficulty. Their use of Bohairic Coptic is primarily confined to liturgy and poetic/musical elements within it, and part of the liturgy is also in Classical Arabic, and incorporates elements of Palestinian Christian liturgical practices. Qubti (meaning "Coptic") is a family name among Palestinians, recognizing their ancestors are Christians who came from Egypt.

=== English ===
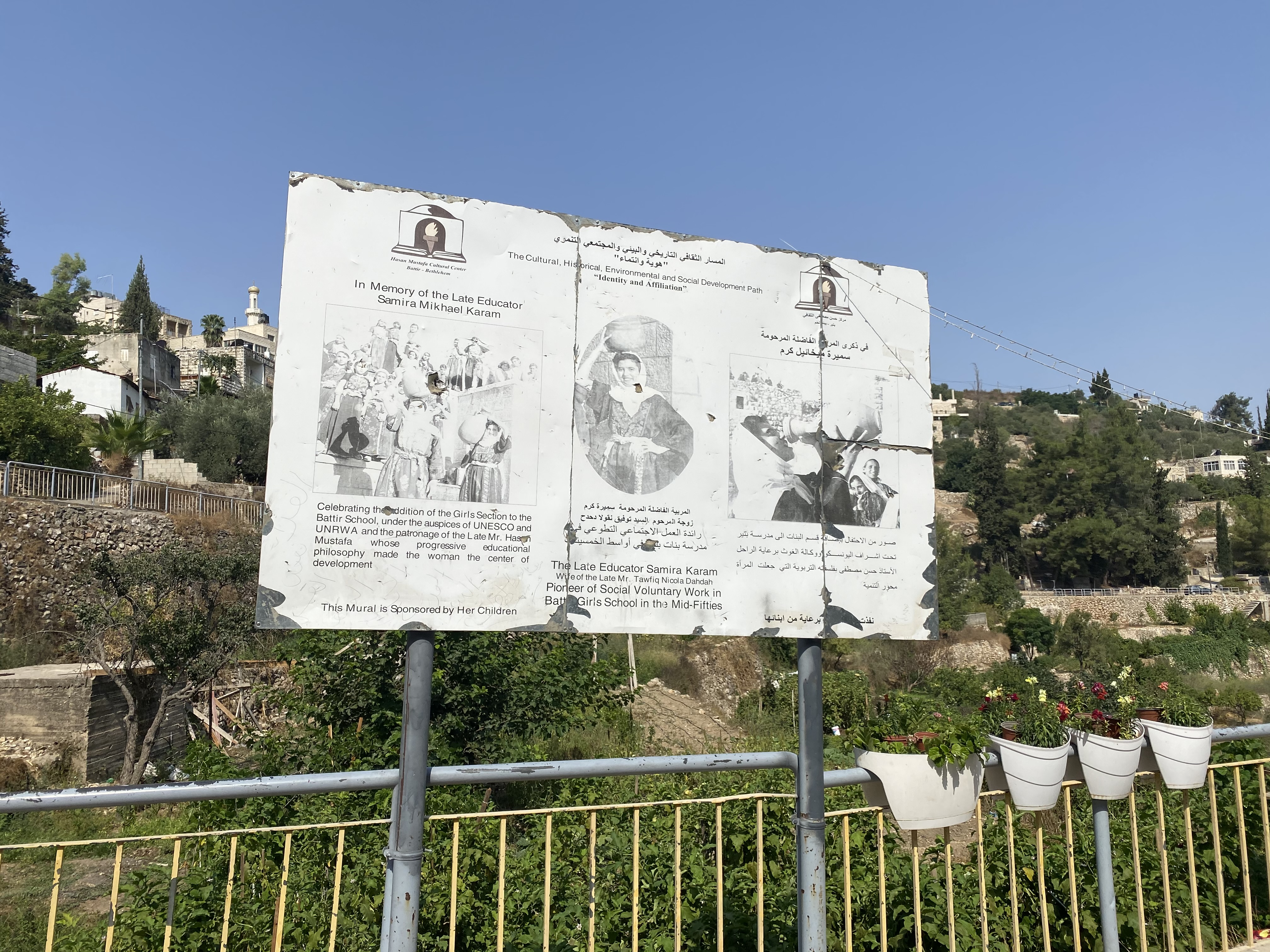
Sign in Battir, West Bank, which is in Arabic and English.

Use and knowledge of English in Palestine varies according to educational level, age, and degree of social media usage. For example, a study in Hebron on attitudes toward code-switching between Arabic and English, found that participants' attitude towards the acceptability of code-switching depended on the context in which it was done, acknowledging that its use by those in a university setting with an English curriculum was neutral, while its use in daily conversations was not. The participants were mostly (80%+) holders' of Bachelor's degrees and roughly the same percentage indicated they were fluent in English.

Another study from 2020 that examined English language output of students at An-Najah University in Nablus rejected characterizing Palestinian learners of English there as fully bilingual (or biliterate), despite educational instruction for most beginning in grade one, concluding that the monolingual environment of daily life outside the university meant that the students were better characterized as "late bilinguals" or "emergent learners of English".

Because computer-mediated communication requires basic knowledge of the Latin alphabet to, for example, enter domain names for websites, there is almost universal knowledge of English letters. These have been used, particularly among the younger generations to transcribe and transliterate the spoken Palestinian Arabic dialects (among others throughout the Arab world), producing a language writing system for Arabic known as Arabizi.

=== Modern Hebrew ===
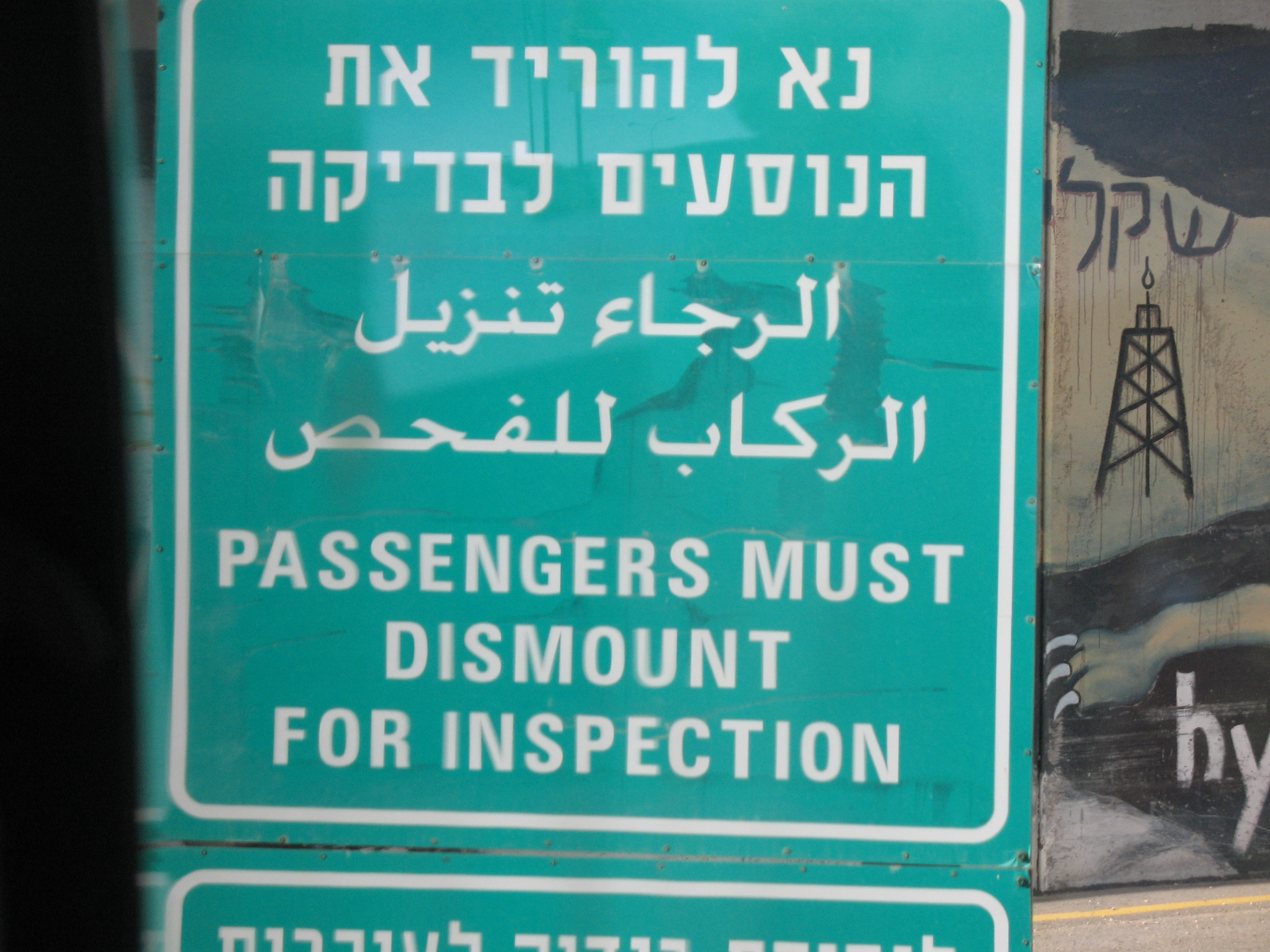
Bethlehem checkpoint 1397 trilingual signage, from top to bottom: Hebrew, Arabic, English

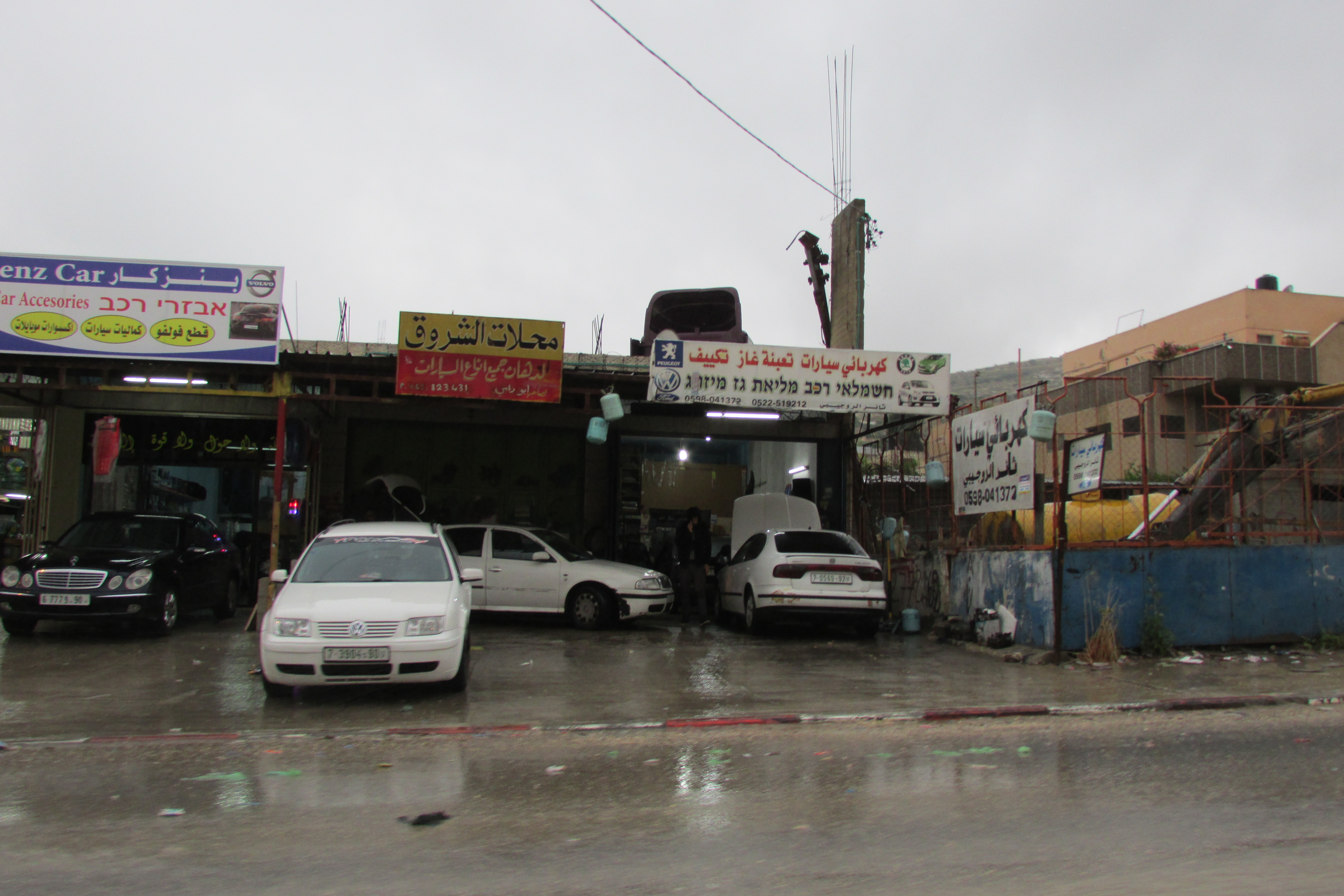
Trilingual (Arabic, English, Hebrew), monolingual (Arabic), and bilingual (Arabic, Hebrew) signs on the Palestinian-owned automotive repair shops lining the main street passing through Huwarra that Israeli settlers regularly use to get to and from their settlements

Palestine is widely recognized as an occupied state, and the establishment since 1967 of Israeli settlements on territory it claims is also viewed as illegal. The official language of Israel and the main language of its citizenry, including the 688,263 (as of 2018) residents of settlements in the West Bank is Modern Hebrew, with Russian, Amharic, English and other European languages also spoken by Jewish settlers or those who immigrated from the former Soviet Union and Ethiopia, among other places. With the exception of Arab citizens of Israel (mostly Palestinians who remained with the areas in which Israel was established in 1948) and Jews who immigrated to Israel from the Arab world, very few other Israeli citizens have functional knowledge of either Arabic or Palestinian Arabic.

The majority of Palestinians who are Israeli citizens are functionally bilingual in both Arabic and Hebrew. In the West Bank and Gaza, where Palestinians carry Palestinian citizenship, knowledge of Hebrew varies, with some fluency acquired among laborers and those imprisoned by the Israeli military occupation. Most Palestinians in the West Bank and Gaza do not like hearing or using Hebrew, but even those who feel this way will sometimes learn Hebrew to be able to navigate the present reality. Palestinians in the West Bank, especially those with business establishments on the periphery of Palestinian towns where the traffic of Israeli settlers passes by will sometimes add Hebrew to their signs to attract customers, though there are conflicting views about courting their business among Palestinians.

=== Samaritan ===
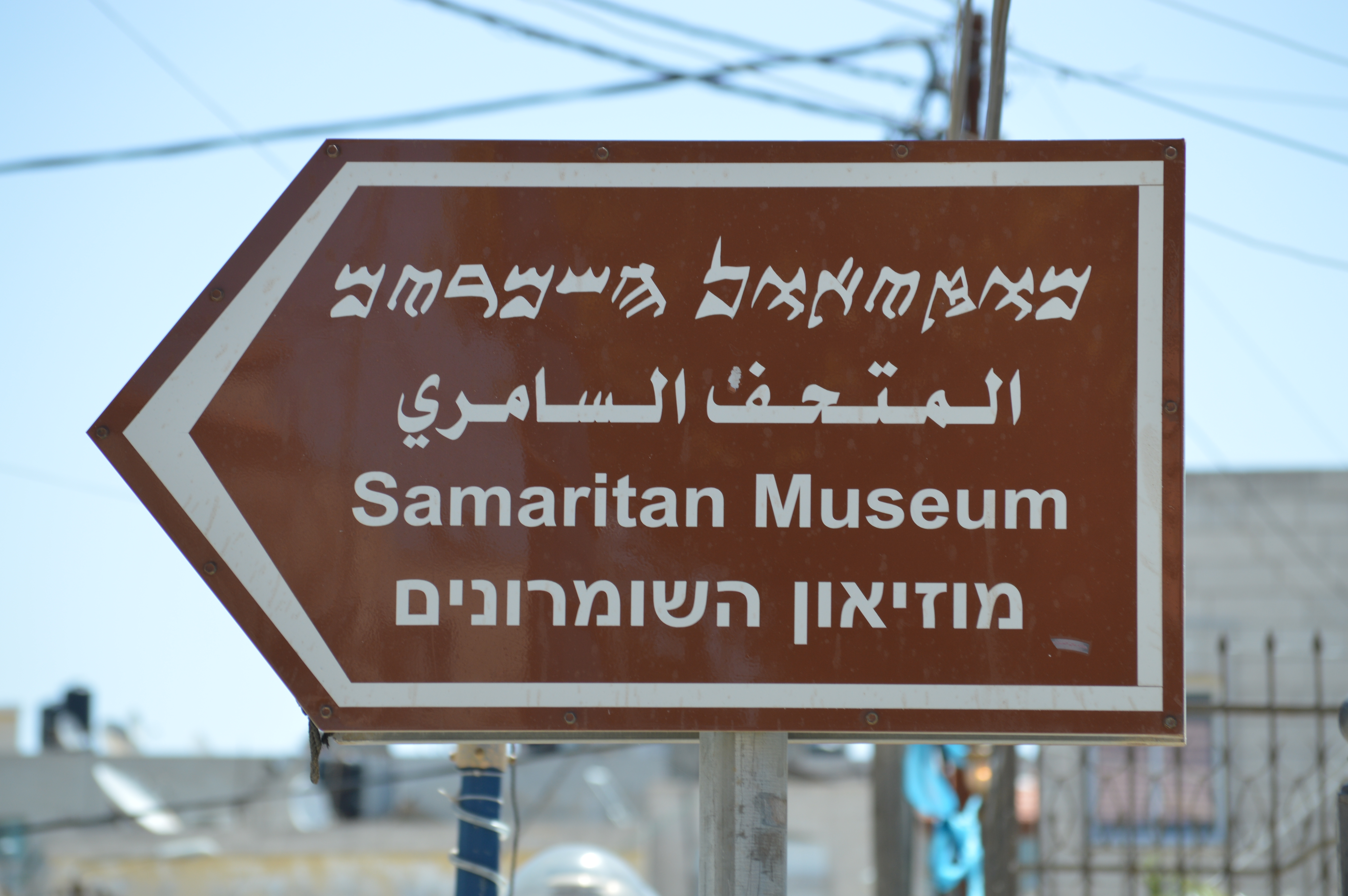
Multilingual street sign on Mount Gerizim, from top to bottom: Samaritan Hebrew, Arabic, English, and Modern Hebrew

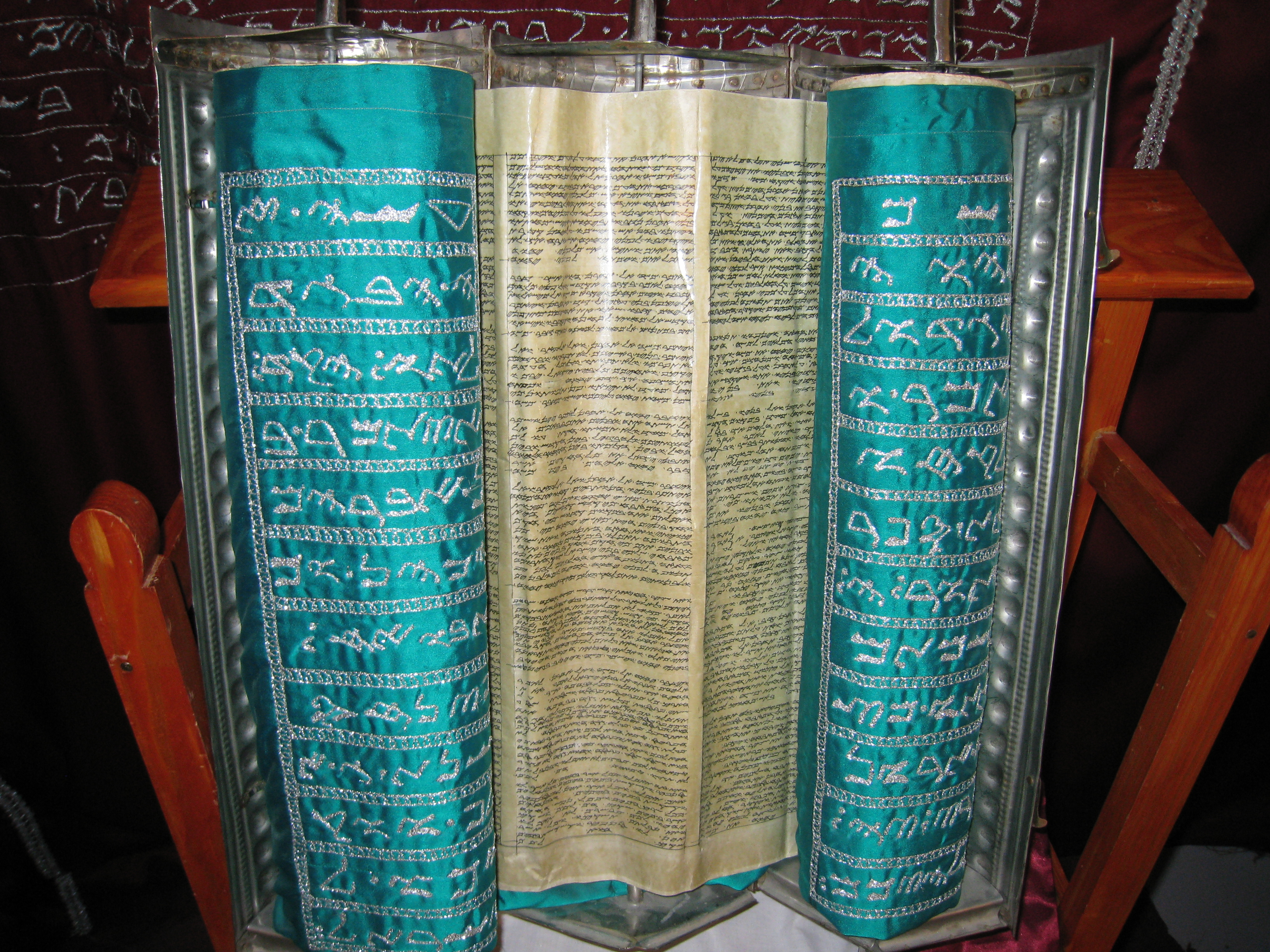
Torah scroll in Samaritan Hebrew

One of the smallest and oldest communities in the region, several ancient Semitic languages, dialects and scripts have been used by Samaritans in Palestine both historically and today. Samaritans number no more than 900 people, about half of whom live on Mount Gerizim, a mountain they have held sacred for millennia. This community used to live in the Old City of Nablus but most of them left to Luza on their sacred mountain overlooking the city during the insecurity of the Second Intifada. Their main language of daily life is Palestinian Arabic, and they hold Palestinian citizenship and have political representatives in the Palestinian Authority. The other half of the Samaritan community live primarily in Holon in Israel, where they speak Modern Hebrew in daily life. All Samaritans were granted the right to Israeli citizenship under Israel's Law of Return, despite their not being considered Jewish by rabbinical authorities.

Samaritan Hebrew is their oldest language, and is written using the Samaritan alphabet, an ancient and distinct variant of the Phoenician (or Canaanite) alphabet. This language ceased being used as a vernacular about two millennia ago, though it continues to be uttered in religious ceremonies, liturgies and songs. Samaritan Aramaic, which was the vernacular until its replacement by Palestinian Arabic in the 11th century, continues to used as a scriptural language as well, and it differs from Samaritan Hebrew in that it is transcribed using Aramaic square script. Besides using Samaritan Arabic centuries ago to write historical and religious texts, Samaritan scribes will also use the Arabic alphabet to transcribe sacred Samaritan Hebrew/Aramaic texts, substituting them letter for letter, a technique known as allography.

== Diaspora and displacement ==
The dispersion of Palestinians as a result of the Nakba and Naksa, as well as continuing emigration due to numerous political and economic factors has had an effect on language use both in and outside of Palestine, and there are numerous linguistic studies of contact-induced change and its impact on language use development. For example, the Palestinian dialect of third-generation Palestinian refugees in Lebanon is increasingly incorporating aspects of Lebanese Arabic, especially among the more educated segments of the refugee population who are more likely to mingle with the broader Lebanese society outside of the Palestinian refugee camps.

Another study of Palestinians who are native to the city of Jaffa explored how dialect development and language use diverged between those who were displaced to the Gaza Strip in 1948 and their descendants, and those who remained in their ancestral city which became part of Israel, and the effects of the dominant Hebrew language environment on their mother tongue and dialect over time. Among its findings were that refugees from Jaffa in Gaza preserved certain features of their original city's dialect, reinforcing their shared sense of community, while the dialect of those still in Jaffa was diverging from its origins. The reduced phonemic inventory of Modern Hebrew, whose reconstitution in the late 19th eliminated many Semitic pharyngeal consonants, emphatic consonants, and uvular stops under the influence of European phonemes in Yiddish, has influenced the speech patterns of Palestinian Arabic speakers in Jaffa, most of whom are Arabic-Hebrew bilingual and regularly interact in Hebrew with Israeli Jews. This shows when tracking how frequently, for example, Jaffa residing Palestinian Arabic speakers lenite in their pronunciation of the letter ayin, a tendency especially pronounced among the youth, whereas the Gaza residing Palestinian Arabic speakers do not.

== See also ==
- Demographics of Palestine
