= Samaritan vocalization =

System of diacritical signs for Samaritan script

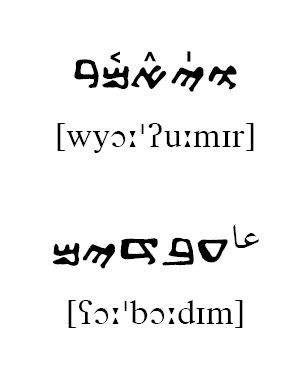
Examples of Samaritan vocalization for the words ויאמר and עבדים in the Samaritan script

The Samaritan vocalization (or Samaritan pointing, Samaritan niqqud; Hebrew: ניקוד שומרוני) is a system of diacritics used with the Samaritan script to indicate vowel quality and gemination which reflects Samaritan Hebrew. It is used by the Samaritans to provide guidance on the pronunciation of the consonantal text of the Samaritan Pentateuch and Samaritan prayer books. The Samaritan vocalization is estimated to have been invented around the 10th century CE. Variation exists within the system between different manuscripts.

== Description ==
Samaritan niqqud
Pronunciation	Niqqud with ࠌ/מ	Unicode character
/a~ɒ/		U+0820 ◌ࠠ SAMARITAN VOWEL SIGN AA
/e/		U+081D ◌ࠝ SAMARITAN VOWEL SIGN E
/i/		U+082A ◌ࠪ SAMARITAN VOWEL SIGN I
/o/	-	U+082B ◌ࠫ SAMARITAN VOWEL SIGN O
/u/		U+0827 ◌ࠧ SAMARITAN VOWEL SIGN U
(geminate consonant)		U+0819 ◌࠙ SAMARITAN MARK DAGESH
Pronunciation	Niqqud with ࠏ/ע	Unicode character
(occlusion)		U+0818 ◌࠘ SAMARITAN MARK OCCLUSION
/ʕa/		U+0816 ◌ࠖ SAMARITAN MARK IN
/ʕa/		U+0817 ◌ࠗ SAMARITAN MARK IN-ALAF

== See also ==
- Samaritan (Unicode block)
