= Samaritan language =

Samaritan language may refer to:

- Samaritan Aramaic language
- Samaritan Hebrew language
