= Samaritan (Unicode block) =

- Range: U+0800..U+083F (64 code points)
- Plane: BMP
- Scripts: Samaritan
- Major alphabets: Samaritan Hebrew; Samaritan Aramaic
- Assigned: 61 code points
- Unused: 3 reserved code points

Unicode version history
- 5.2 (2009): 61 (+61)

Unicode documentation
- Code chart ∣ Web page

Samaritan is a Unicode block containing characters used for writing Samaritan Hebrew and Aramaic.

Samaritan^{[1]}^{[2]} Official Unicode Consortium code chart (PDF)
	0	1	2	3	4	5	6	7	8	9	A	B	C	D	E	F
U+080x	ࠀ	ࠁ	ࠂ	ࠃ	ࠄ	ࠅ	ࠆ	ࠇ	ࠈ	ࠉ	ࠊ	ࠋ	ࠌ	ࠍ	ࠎ	ࠏ
U+081x	ࠐ	ࠑ	ࠒ	ࠓ	ࠔ	ࠕ	ࠖ	ࠗ	࠘	࠙	ࠚ	ࠛ	ࠜ	ࠝ	ࠞ	ࠟ
U+082x	ࠠ	ࠡ	ࠢ	ࠣ	ࠤ	ࠥ	ࠦ	ࠧ	ࠨ	ࠩ	ࠪ	ࠫ	ࠬ	࠭		
U+083x	࠰	࠱	࠲	࠳	࠴	࠵	࠶	࠷	࠸	࠹	࠺	࠻	࠼	࠽	࠾	
Notes: 1. As of Unicode version 16.0; 2. Grey areas indicate non-assigned code points

== History ==
The following Unicode-related documents record the purpose and process of defining specific characters in the Samaritan block:

Version	Final code points (Note: Proposed code points and characters names may differ from final code points and names)	Count	L2 ID	WG2 ID	Document
5.2	U+0800..082D, 0830..083E	61	L2/03-206		Constable, Peter (2003-06-13), Proposal to encode Samaritan Pentateuch Sign
5.2	U+0800..082D, 0830..083E	61	L2/04-159	N2758	Keown, Elaine (2004-05-12), Proposal to add Samaritan Pointing to ISO 10646
5.2	U+0800..082D, 0830..083E	61		N3353 (pdf, doc)	Umamaheswaran, V. S. (2007-10-10), "M51.13", Unconfirmed minutes of WG 2 meeting 51 Hanzhou, China; 2007-04-24/27
5.2	U+0800..082D, 0830..083E	61	L2/07-231	N3291	Everson, Michael; Shoulson, Mark (2007-07-27), Preliminary proposal to add the Samaritan alphabet to the BMP of the UCS
5.2	U+0800..082D, 0830..083E	61	L2/07-258		Whistler, Ken (2007-08-02), Middle Dots and Don'ts
5.2	U+0800..082D, 0830..083E	61	L2/07-260		Freytag, Asmus (2007-08-05), Non-blank spaces
5.2	U+0800..082D, 0830..083E	61	L2/07-225		Moore, Lisa (2007-08-21), "C.13", UTC #112 Minutes
5.2	U+0800..082D, 0830..083E	61	L2/08-024	N3377	Everson, Michael (2008-01-25), Proposal to add the Samaritan alphabet to the BMP of the UCS
5.2	U+0800..082D, 0830..083E	61	L2/08-003		Moore, Lisa (2008-02-14), "Samaritan", UTC #114 Minutes
5.2	U+0800..082D, 0830..083E	61	L2/08-318	N3453 (pdf, doc)	Umamaheswaran, V. S. (2008-08-13), "M52.8", Unconfirmed minutes of WG 2 meeting 52
