= Samaritan Hebrew =

Reading tradition used liturgically by the Samaritans

- ࠏࠁࠓࠉࠕ Îbrit
- Pronunciation: [iːbrit]
- Region: Israel and Palestine, predominantly in Nablus and Holon
- Extinct: c. 2nd century survives in liturgical use
- Language family: Afro-Asiatic: Semitic; West; Central; Northwest; Canaanite; South; Hebrew; Biblical Hebrew; Samaritan Hebrew
- Writing system: Samaritan script

Language codes
- ISO 639-3: smp
- Glottolog: sama1313
- Linguasphere: 12-AAB

Samaritan Hebrew (Samaritan Hebrew: ࠏࠨࠁࠬࠓࠪࠉࠕ, romanized: ʿÎbrit) is a reading tradition used liturgically by the Samaritans for reading the Biblical Hebrew of the Samaritan Pentateuch.

For the Samaritans, Ancient Hebrew ceased to be a spoken everyday language. It was succeeded by Samaritan Aramaic, which itself ceased to be a spoken language sometime between the 10th and 12th centuries and was succeeded by Levantine Arabic (specifically, the Samaritan variety of Palestinian Arabic).

The phonology of Samaritan Hebrew is very similar to that of Samaritan Arabic and is used by the Samaritans in prayer. Today, the spoken vernacular among Samaritans is evenly split between Modern Hebrew and Samaritan Arabic, depending on whether they reside in Holon or Kiryat Luza.

== History and discovery ==
The early history of Samaritan Hebrew is poorly documented, though it cannot be easily associated with early Israelian Hebrew. Because of the relatively late divergence of Samaritanism from mainstream Judaism it is only by the first century BCE that there was definitely a separate Samaritan dialect. The roots of the Samaritan dialect are likely older than this, but were not at this point distinctly Samaritan.

The dialect did not survive long in a literary form as by the first century CE, it was already being supplanted by Samaritan Aramaic. Though it remained in liturgical use, Samaritan Hebrew eventually nearly stopped being used as a language for new literary compositions.

Starting in the 1300s, a liturgical revival of Samaritan Hebrew began, which resulted in new Hebrew piyyutim.

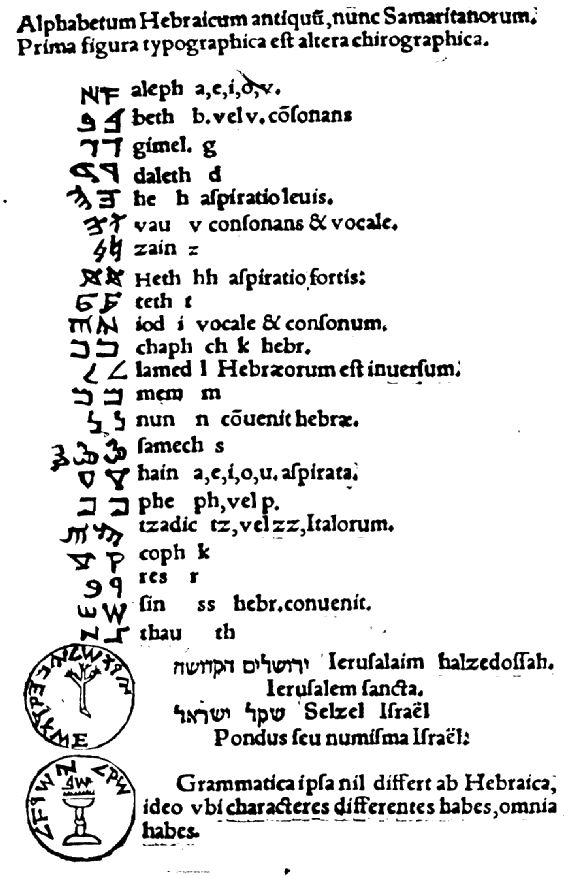
In 1538 Guillaume Postel published the Samaritan alphabet, together with the first Western representation of a coin of the First Jewish Revolt.

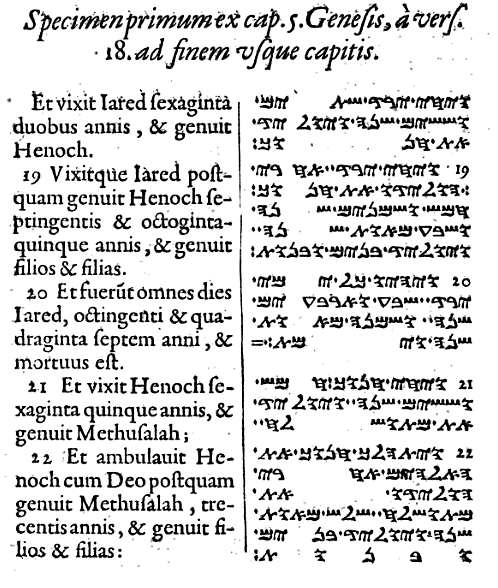
Genesis 5:18–22 as published by Jean Morin in 1631 in the first publication of the Samaritan Pentateuch

The Samaritan language first became known in detail to the Western world with the publication of a manuscript of the Samaritan Pentateuch in 1631 by Jean Morin. In 1616 the traveler Pietro Della Valle had purchased a copy of the text in Damascus. This manuscript, now known as Codex B, was deposited in a Parisian library.

In five volumes between 1957 and 1977, Ze'ev Ben-Haim published his monumental Hebrew-language work on the Hebrew and Aramaic traditions of the Samaritans. Ben-Ḥayyim, whose views prevail today, proved that modern Samaritan Hebrew is not very different from the Hebrew spoken by other local groups in the Second Temple period before Middle Aramaic supplanted it.

== Orthography ==
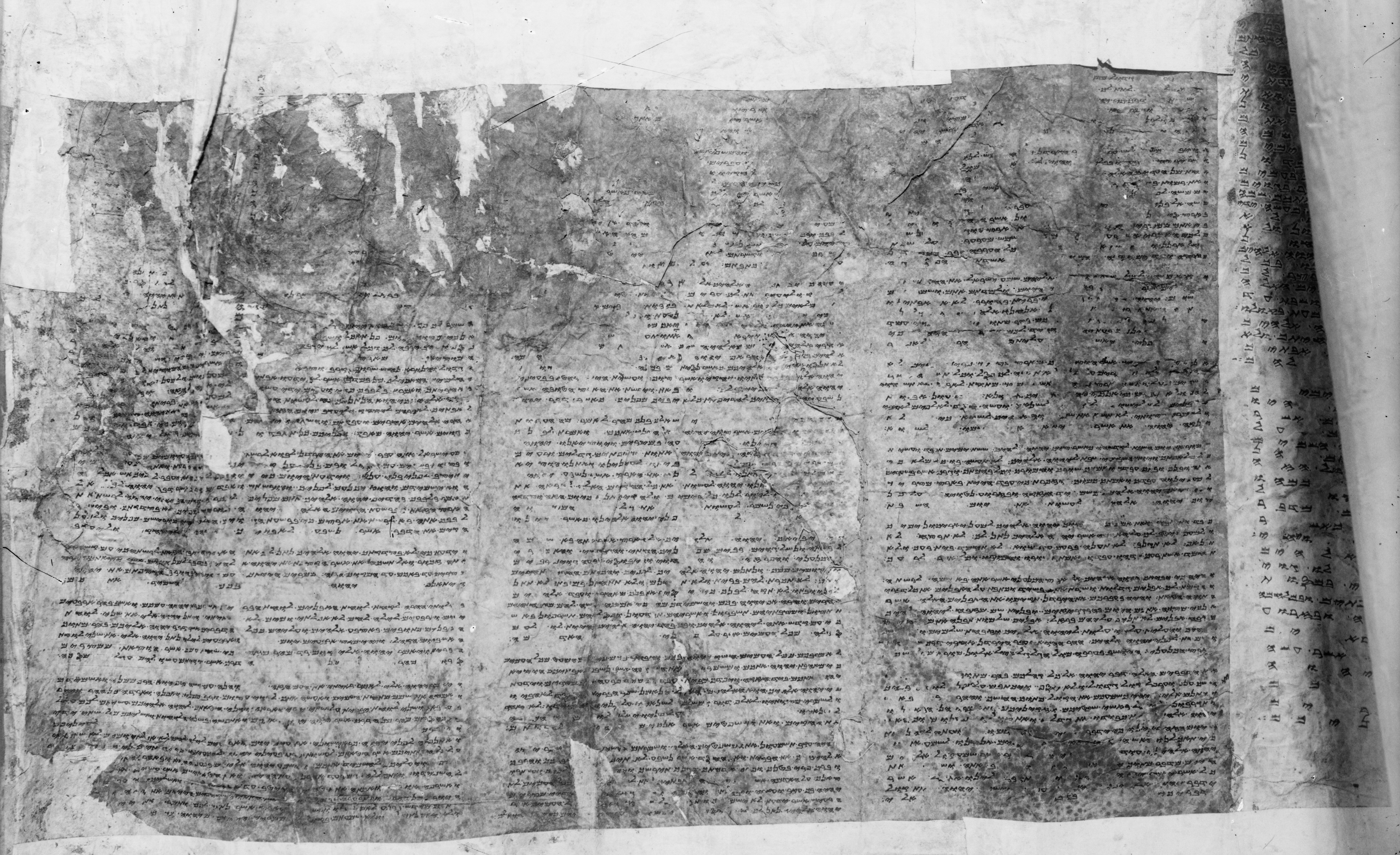
Detail of the Samaritan Pentateuch's oldest scroll, written in Samaritan Hebrew (Nablus, c. 1900–1920)

Samaritan Hebrew is written in the Samaritan alphabet, a direct descendant of the Paleo-Hebrew alphabet, which in turn is a variant of the earlier Proto-Sinaitic script.

The Samaritan alphabet is close to the script that appears on many Ancient Hebrew coins and inscriptions. By contrast, all other varieties of Hebrew, as written by Jews, employ the later square Hebrew alphabet, which is in fact a variation of the Aramaic alphabet that Jews began using in the Babylonian captivity following the exile of the Kingdom of Judah in the 6th century BCE. During the 3rd century BCE, Jews began to use this stylized "square" form of the script used by the Achaemenid Empire for Imperial Aramaic, its chancellery script while the Samaritans continued to use the Paleo-Hebrew alphabet, which evolved into the Samaritan alphabet.

In modern times, a cursive variant of the Samaritan alphabet is used in personal affects.

=== Letter pronunciation ===
Consonants

Name	A'laf	Bit	Ga'man	Da'lat	Iy	Baa	Zen	It	Ṭit	Yut	Kaaf	La'bat	Mim	Nun	Sin'gaat	In	Fi	Tsaa'diy	Quf	Rish	Shan	Taaf
Samaritan Letter	ࠀ	ࠁ	ࠂ	ࠃ	ࠄ	ࠅ	ࠆ	ࠇ	ࠈ	ࠉ	ࠊ	ࠋ	ࠌ	ࠍ	ࠎ	ࠏ	ࠐ	ࠑ	ࠒ	ࠓ	ࠔ	ࠕ
Square Hebrew (Ktav Ashuri) letter	א	ב	ג	ד	ה	ו	ז	ח	ט	י	כ	ל	מ	נ	ס	ע	פ	צ	ק	ר	ש	ת
Pronunciation	[ʔ]	[b]	[ɡ]	[d]	[ʔ]	[b], [w]	[z]	[ʔ], [ʕ]	[tˤ]	[j]	[k]	[l]	[m]	[n]	[s]	[ʔ], [ʕ]	[f], [b]	[sˤ]	[q], [ʔ]	[r]	[ʃ]	[t]

Vowels

Niqqud with ࠌ/מ						, ,
value	/a/, /ɒ/	/e/	/e/, /i/	/o/, /u/	(geminate consonant)	/ʕa/

== Phonology ==
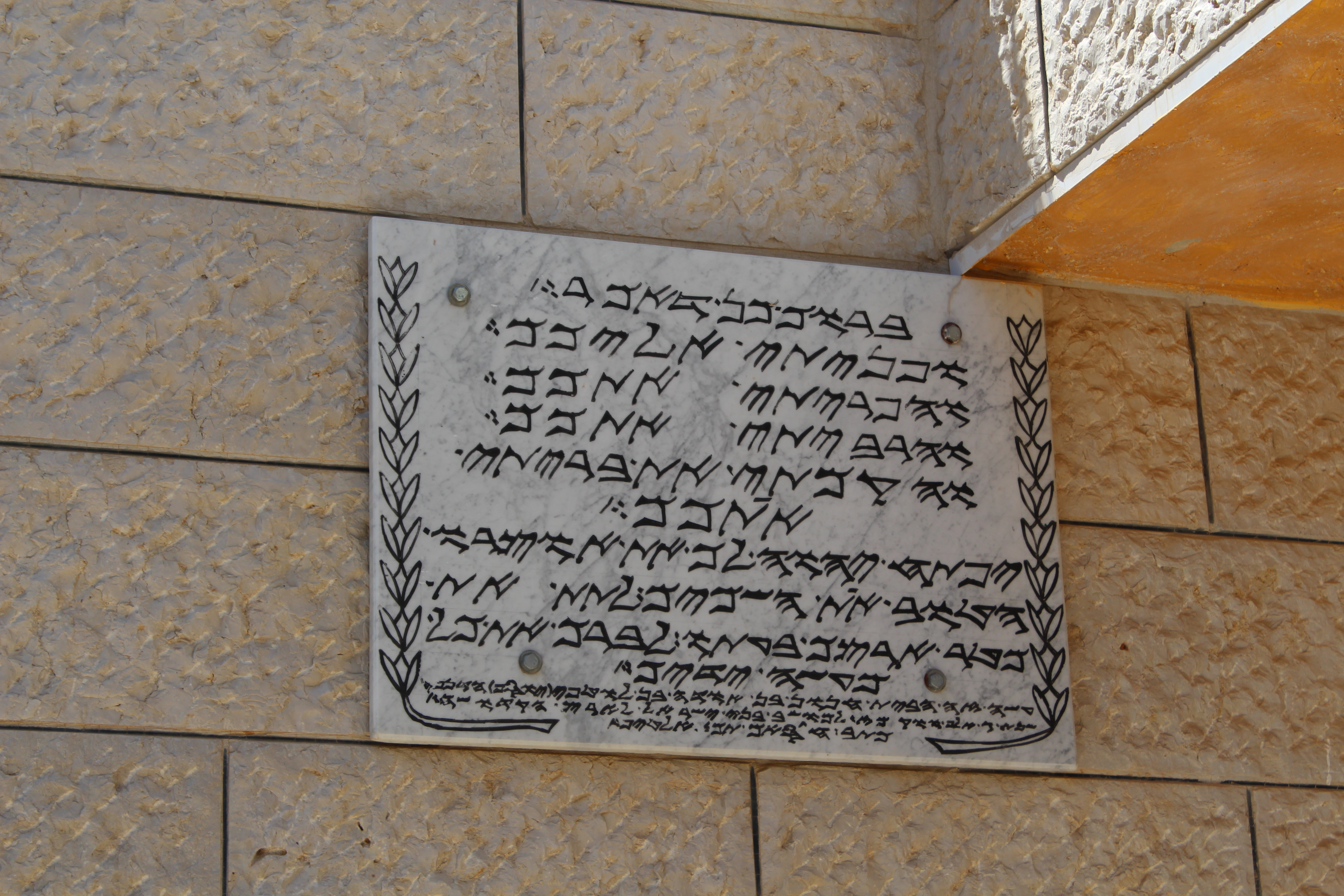
Samaritan Mezuzah, Mount Gerizim

=== Consonants ===
Samaritan Hebrew consonants
		Labial	Alveolar		Palatal	Velar~Uvular		Pharyn- geal	Glottal
		Labial	plain	emp.	Palatal	plain	emp.	Pharyn- geal	Glottal
Nasal		m	n						
Stop	voiceless		t	tˤ		k	q		ʔ
Stop	voiced	b	d			ɡ			
Fricative	voiceless	f	s	sˤ	ʃ				
Fricative	voiced		z					ʕ	
Approximant			l		j	w			
Trill			r						

Samaritan Hebrew shows the following consonantal differences from Biblical Hebrew: The original phonemes */b ɡ d k p t/ do not have spirantized allophones, though at least some did originally in Samaritan Hebrew (evidenced in the preposition "in" ב- /av/ or /b/). */p/ has shifted to /f/ (except occasionally */pː/ > /bː/). */w/ has shifted to /b/ everywhere except in the conjunction ו- 'and' where it is pronounced as /w/. */ɬ/ has merged with /ʃ/, unlike in all other contemporary Hebrew traditions in which it is pronounced /s/. The laryngeals /ʔ ħ h ʕ/ have become /ʔ/ or null everywhere, except before /a ɒ/ where */ħ ʕ/ sometimes become /ʕ/. /q/ is sometimes pronounced as [ʔ], though not in Pentateuch reading, as a result of influence from Samaritan Arabic. /q/ may also be pronounced as [χ], but this occurs only rarely and in fluent reading.

=== Vowels ===
Samaritan vowels
	Front	Back
Close	i iː	u uː
Mid	e eː	(o)
Open	a aː	ɒ ɒː
Reduced	(ə)	

Phonemic length is contrastive, e.g. /rɒb/ רב 'great' vs. /rɒːb/ רחב 'wide'. Long vowels are usually the result of the elision of guttural consonants.

/i/ and /e/ are both realized as [ə] in closed post-tonic syllables, e.g. /bit/ בית 'house' /abbət/ הבית 'the house' /ɡer/ גר /aɡɡər/ הגר. In other cases, stressed /i/ shifts to /e/ when that syllable is no longer stressed, e.g. /dabbirti/ דברתי but דברתמה /dabbertimma/. /u/ and /o/ only contrast in open post-tonic syllables, e.g. ידו /jedu/ 'his hand' ידיו /jedo/ 'his hands', where /o/ stems from a contracted diphthong. In other environments, /o/ appears in closed syllables and /u/ in open syllables, e.g. דור /dor/ דורות /durot/.

=== Stress ===
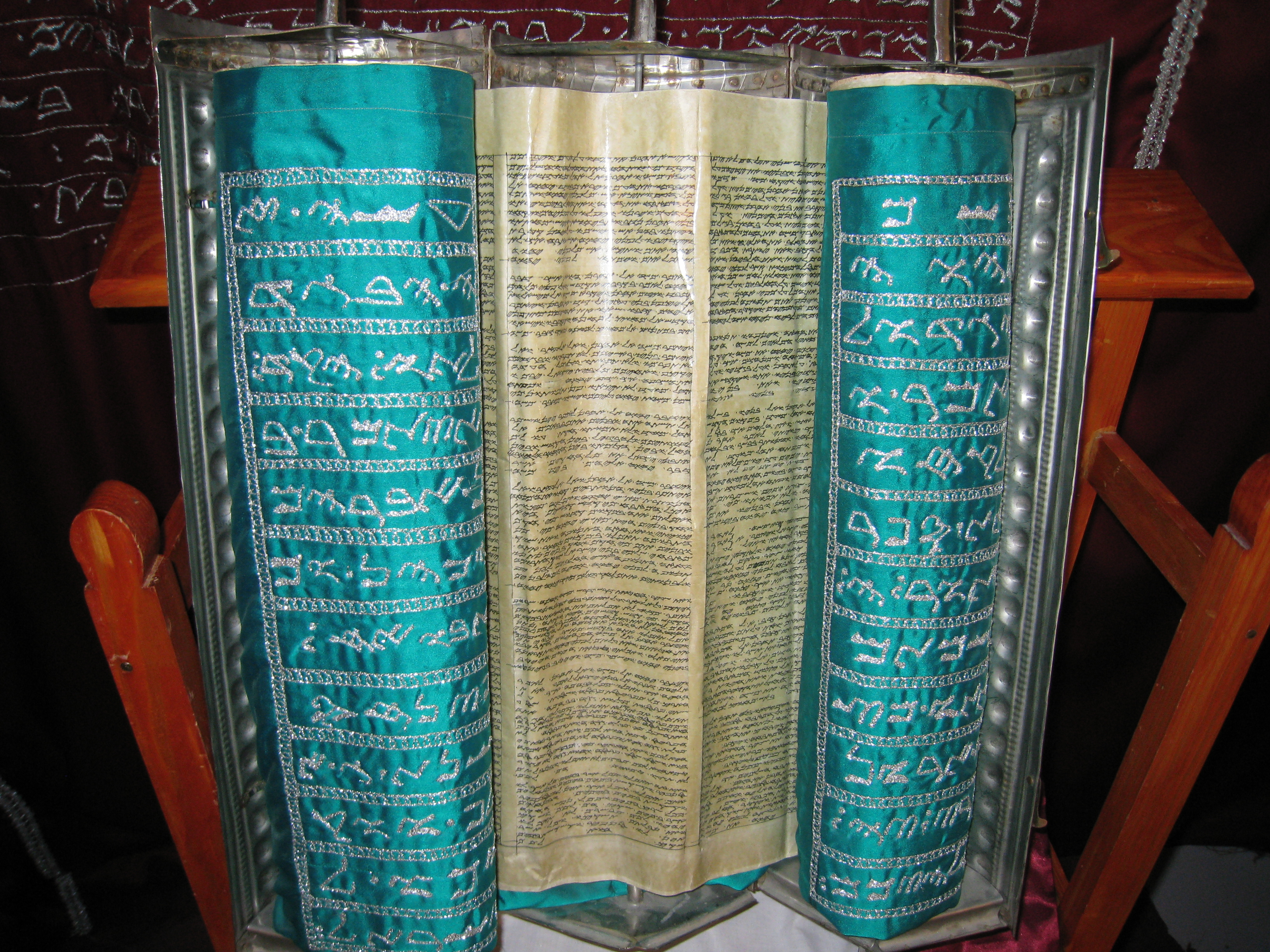
Samaritan Torah Scroll

Stress generally differs from other traditions, being found usually on the penultimate and sometimes on the ultimate.

== Grammar ==
=== Pronouns ===
==== Personal ====
		singular	plural
1st person		ࠀࠍࠊࠉ ā̊nā̊ki	ࠀࠍࠇࠍࠅ ā̊nā̊nnu
2nd person	male	ࠀࠕࠄ åttå	ࠀࠕࠌ attimma
2nd person	female	ࠀࠕ(ࠉ) åtti (note the final yodh)	ࠀࠕࠍ attən
3rd person	male	ࠄࠅࠀ ū	ࠄࠌ imma
3rd person	female	ࠄࠉࠀ ī	ࠄࠍࠄ inna

==== Demonstrative ====
		this	that
singular	masc	ࠆࠄ zē	alaz (written with a he at the beginning).
singular	fem	ࠆࠀࠕ zē'ot	alaz (written with a he at the beginning).
plural		ࠀࠋࠄ illa	alaz (written with a he at the beginning).

==== Relative ====
Who, which: éšar.

==== Interrogative ====
- Who? = ࠌࠉ mī.
- What? = ࠌࠄ mā̊.

=== Noun ===
When suffixes are added, ē and ō in an unstressed syllable may become ī and ū: bōr (Judean bohr) "pit" > buˈrōt "pits". Note also af "anger" > ˈeppa "her anger".

Segolates behave more or less as in other Hebrew varieties: ˈbeṭen "stomach" > ˈbaṭnek "your stomach," ke′seph "silver" > ke′sefánu (Judean Hebrew kasˈpenu) "our silver," ˈderek > dirkaˈkimma "your (m. pl.) road" but ˈareṣ (in Judean Hebrew: ˈʾereṣ) "earth" > ˈarṣak (Judean Hebrew ˈʾárṣeḵa) "your earth".

==== Article ====
The definite article is a- or e-, and causes gemination of the following consonant unless it is a guttural; it is written with a he, but as usual, the h is silent. Thus, for example: ˈennar / ˈannar = "the youth"; elˈlēm = "the meat"; aˈʾemor = "the donkey".

==== Number ====
Regular plural suffixes are

- masc: -ˈēm (Judean Hebrew -im)
  - eyyaˈmēm "the days"
- fem: -ˈt (Judean Hebrew: -oth.)
  - elaˈmōt "dreams"

Dual is sometimes -aˈyem (Judean Hebrew: -ˈayim), šenatayem "two years," usually -ˈēm like the plural yeˈdēm "hands" (Judean yaˈḏayim.)

=== Tradition of the Divine Name ===
Similar to Jews, Samaritans have the tradition of taboo avoidance of the Tetragrammaton, either spelling out loud with the Samaritan letters: "Yoḏ Ye Bā Ye", or saying Shema "the Name" in Aramaic, similar to Judean HaShem.

=== Verbs ===
Affixes
		perfect		imperfect	
		singular	plural	singular	plural
1st person		-ti	-nu	e-	ne-
2nd person	male	-ta	-tímma	ti-	te- -un
2nd person	female	-ti	-tên	ti- -i	te- -na
3rd person	male	-	-u	yi-	yi- -u
3rd person	female	-a	?	ti-	ti- -inna

=== Particles ===
==== Prepositions ====
"in, using", pronounced:

- b- before a vowel (or, therefore, a former guttural): b-érbi = "with a sword"; b-íštu "with his wife".
- ba- before a bilabial consonant: bá-bêt (Judean Hebrew: ba-ba′yith) "in a house", ba-mádbar "in a wilderness"
- ev- before other consonant: ev-lila "in a night", ev-dévar "with the thing".
- ba-/be- before the definite article ("the"): barrášet (Judean Hebrew: Bere'·shith') "in the beginning"; béyyôm "in the day".

"as, like", pronounced:

- ka without the article: ka-demútu "in his likeness"
- ke with the article: ké-yyôm "like the day".

"to" pronounced:

- l- before a vowel: l-ávi "to my father", l-évad "to the slave"
- el-, al- before a consonant: al-béni "to the children (of)"
- le- before l: le-léket "to go"
- l- before the article: lammúad "at the appointed time"; la-şé'on "to the flock"

"and" pronounced:

- w- before consonants: wal-Šárra "and to Sarah"
- u- before vowels: u-yeššeg "and he caught up".

Other prepositions:

- al: towards
- elfáni: before
- bêd-u: for him
- elqérôt: against
- balêd-i: except me

==== Conjunctions ====
- u: or
- em: if, when
- avel: but

==== Adverbs ====
- la: not
- kâ: also
- afu: also
- ín-ak: you are not
- ífa (ípa): where?
- méti: when
- fâ: here
- šémma: there
- mittét: under

== See also ==
- Biblical Hebrew
- Samaritans
- Hebrew
- Samaritanism

== Bibliography ==
- J. Rosenberg, Lehrbuch der samaritanischen Sprache und Literatur, A. Hartleben's Verlag: Wien, Pest, Leipzig.
- Ben-Ḥayyim, Ze'ev (2000). A Grammar of Samaritan Hebrew. Jerusalem: The Hebrew University Magnes Press. ISBN 1-57506-047-7.
- Flôrenṭîn, Moše (2005). Late Samaritan Hebrew: A Linguistic Analysis Of Its Different Types. BRILL. ISBN 9789004138414.
