= Samaritan Aramaic =

Dialect of Aramaic used by the Samaritans

- ࠀࠓࠌࠉࠕ Arāmît
- Pronunciation: [arɑmiθ], [arɑmit], [ɑrɑmɑjɑ], [ɔrɔmɔjɔ]
- Region: Israel and Palestine, predominantly in Samaria and Holon.
- Extinct: by 12th century; liturgical use
- Language family: Afro-Asiatic: Semitic; Central Semitic; Northwest Semitic; Aramaic; Western; Jewish Palestinian Aramaic; Samaritan Aramaic
- Early forms: Proto-Afroasiatic: Proto-Semitic; Old Aramaic; Middle Aramaic; Jewish Palestinian Aramaic
- Writing system: Samaritan alphabet

Language codes
- ISO 639-2: sam
- ISO 639-3: sam
- Glottolog: sama1314

Samaritan Aramaic was the dialect of Aramaic used by the Samaritans in their sacred and scholarly literature.

== Description ==
It became extinct some time between the 10th and the 12th centuries, with Samaritans switching to Palestinian Arabic as their vernacular.

In form, Samaritan Aramaic resembles the Aramaic of the Targumim, and is written in the Samaritan alphabet. Important works written in it include the translation of the Samaritan Pentateuch, legal, exegetical and liturgical texts.

== Sample ==
Exodus 20:1-6 in Samaritan Aramaic, transliterated:

1. Umellel Elâ'e yet kel milleyya aalen l'mimar.
2. Ana Šema Eluek deppiqtek men ara d'Miṣrem mibbet av'doothah.
3. La ya'i lakk elah ahkharin, bar minah.
4. La tewed lakh tsilam v'khal d'mu debšumeyya milleilah wedbaraa millera wedbameyya mil'ra l'ar'ah.
5. La tisgad l'hon v'la tifli'khinon arei anah ala anaki Šema elaak el kana mas'ar khoveih awaan al b'nin m'rahdin al dahr t'leethai v'ah; dahr r'vee'ai l'sahnai kad mašl'meen b'nayah l'meekhtei bathar avahth'hohn.
6. Wabed teivoo l'al'fei dahreen l'rahkhamai welnateri fiqqudi.

Notice the similarities with Judeo-Aramaic as found in Targum Onqelos to this same passage (some expressions below are paraphrased, not literally translated):

1. Umalleil Adonai yath kol pithghamayya ha'illein lemeimar
  וּמַלֵּיל יְיָ יָת כָּל פִּתְגָמַיָּא הָאִלֵּין לְמֵימַר
2. Ana Adonai elahakh de'appeiqtakh me'arʕa deMiṣrayim mibbeith ʕavdhutha
  אֲנָא יְיָ אֱלָהָךְ דְּאַפֵּיקְתָּךְ מֵאַרְעָא דְּמִצְרַיִם מִבֵּית עַבְדוּתָא
3. La yihvei lakh elah okharan, bar minni
  לָא יִהְוֵי לָךְ אֱלָהּ אָחֳרָן, בָּר מִנִּי
4. La taʕaveidh lakh ṣeilam vekhol demu devišmayya millʕeila vedhiv'arʕa milleraʕ vedhivmayya milleraʕ le'arʕa
  לָא תַּעֲבֵיד לָךְ צֵילַם וְכָל דְּמוּ דְּבִשְׁמַיָּא מִלְּעֵילָא וְדִבְאַרְעָא מִלְּרַע וְדִבְמַיָּא מִלְּרַע לְאַרְעָא
5. La tisgodh lehon vela tifleḥinnin arei ana Adonai elahakh el qanna masʕar ḥovei avahan ʕal benin maradhin ʕal dar telithai veʕal dar reviʕai lesane'ai kadh mašlemin benayya lemiḥtei bathar avahathehon
  לָא תִּסְגּוֹד לְהוֹן וְלָא תִּפְלְחִנִּין אֲרֵי אֲנָא יְיָ אֱלָהָךְ אֵל קַנָּא מַסְעַר חוֹבֵי אֲבָהָן עַל בְּנִין מָרָדִין עַל דָּר תְּלִיתַאי וְעַל דָּר רְבִיעַאי לְסָנְאָי כַּד מַשְׁלְמִין בְּנַיָּא לְמִחְטֵי בָּתַר אֲבָהָתְהוֹן
6. Veʕaveidh teivu le'alfei darin leraḥamai ulenatrei piqqodhai
  וְעָבֵיד טֵיבוּ לְאַלְפֵי דָּרִין לְרָחֲמַי וּלְנָטְרֵי פִּקּוֹדָי

== See also ==
- Christian Palestinian Aramaic
- Jewish Babylonian Aramaic
- Jewish Palestinian Aramaic
- Mandaic language
- Western Neo-Aramaic

== Bibliography ==
- J. Rosenberg, Lehrbuch der samaritanischen Sprache und Literatur, A. Hartleben's Verlag: Wien, Pest, Leipzig.
- Nicholls, G. F. A Grammar of the Samaritan Language with Extracts and Vocabulary. London: Samuel Bagster and Sons, 1858.
- Tal, Abraham, A Dictionary of Samaritan Aramaic: Brill 2000 ISBN 90-04-11645-1
