= Time periods in the Palestine region =

Time periods in the region of Palestine summarizes the major time periods in the history of the region of Palestine/Land of Israel, and notes the major events in each time period.

Period (Archaeological age)	Period name	Ruling regime	Region names	Major events
4000–3300 BC (Levantine Chalcolithic)	Pre-history			Main article: Prehistory of the Levant: Initial use of copper, agriculture become the basis of the economy, the formation of the first cities.
3300–1000 BC (Bronze Age and Iron Age I)	The Canaanite and Egyptian period	Canaanites / New Kingdom Egypt	Canaan / Djahy	Initial fortification of cities, people used bronze, initial use of writing systems. The Late Bronze Age is characterized by individual city-states and domination by Egypt.; 1700 BC: the period of the Patriarchs in the region (Biblical sources only); c. 1550–1400 BC: Egyptian New Kingdom reunites Egypt and expands into the Levant under Ahmose I and Thutmose I; c. 1330 BC: Amarna letters correspondence between vassal Canaanite rulers and Amenhotep III; 1178 BC: The Battle of Djahy (Canaan) between Ramesses III and the Sea Peoples marks the beginning of the decline in power of the New Kingdom in the Levant during the Bronze Age collapse; Collapse of Canaanite cities, settlement increase in hill country and in Transjordan
1000–732 BC (Iron Age IIA+B)	The Israelite period	Ancient Israel and Judah	Kingdom of Israel (united monarchy) / Kingdom of Israel (Samaria) / Kingdom of Judah / Philistia / Territorial environs of Arabu, Edom, Phoenicia	1030–930 BC: The United Kingdom of Israel: the kingdom of Saul, Ishbaal, David and Solomon (Biblical sources only, dates are estimated).; 928 BC: Kingdom splits into two kingdoms: Israel in the north and Judah (containing Jerusalem) in the south. (Biblical sources only, dates are estimated).; Intrusion of Assyria into the region, states and cities lose independence.
732–539 BC (Iron Age IIC)	Neo-Assyrian and Neo-Babylonian periods	Neo-Assyrian Empire and Neo-Babylonian Empire	Eber-Nari / Yehud	732 BC: The region becomes a vassal of the Neo-Assyrian Empire under Tiglath Pileser III - Israel by conquest and Judah by vassalage. Thousands of Israelites are forcibly relocated to elsewhere in the Empire.; 627 BC: The death of Ashurbanipal and the successful revolt of Nabopolassar replaces the Neo-Assyrian Empire with the Neo-Babylonian Empire; 609 BC: The region becomes part of the Empire of the Twenty-sixth dynasty of Egypt after the Battle of Megiddo (609 BC), only to switch back after the Battle of Carchemish in 605 BC; 587–6 BC: Nebuchadnezzar II fought Pharaoh Apries's attempt to invade the region. Jerusalem mostly destroyed including the First Temple, and the city's prominent citizens exiled Babylonian captivity (Biblical sources only)
539–332 BC	The Persian period	Persian Empire	Eber-Nari / Province of Judah / Palestina	539 BC: Cyrus the Great conquered the Babylonian Empire and gave the Jews permission to return to the Yehud province.; 516 BC: Construction of the Second Temple.; 485–465 BC: Kingdom of Xerxes I of Persia.
332–37 BC	The Hellenistic period	Hellenistic Greece (Ptolemaic / Seleucid Kingdoms), Hasmonean Kingdom	Cœle-Syria / Palestine/ Hasmonean Judea / Decapolis / Paralia / Acre / Dor	332 BC: Alexander the Great conquered the region from the Persian Empire.; 301 BC: Ptolemy I Soter conquered the region from the heirs of Alexander the Great.; 200 BC: Antiochus III the Great from the Seleucid dynasty conquered the region from the Ptolemaic dynasty.; 167–160 BC: Maccabean Revolt; 160–63 BC: The independent rule of the Hasmoneans.; 63 BC-37 BC: Roman and Parthian influence
37 BC – 6 AD	The Early Roman period	Roman Republic / Roman Empire	Herodian Judea / Tetrarchy of Judea / Decapolis / Territorial environs of Syria, Aegyptus	37 BC: Herod the Great seizes power in Judea.; 19 BC: Herod the Great further extends the Temple Mount's natural plateau and rebuilds the temple.; 4 BC: King Herod dies. Herodian Kingdom divided to Tetrarchies under Roman protection.
6–135 AD	The Early Roman period	Roman Republic / Roman Empire	Judaea (Roman province) / Samaria / Idumea / Galilee / Decapolis	6 AD - Census of Quirinius. Revolt by Judas of Galilee.; 66–73 AD: First Jewish–Roman War. Leads to destruction of Jewish Temple (70 AD) and the conquest of Masada (73 AD).; 115–119 AD: Revolt against Trajan reaches Judea province, the last rebels are defeated in Lydda.; 130 AD: Roman emperor Hadrian order construction of a pagan Roman "Colonia Aelia Capitolina" on the ruins of Jerusalem.; 132–135 AD: The Bar Kokhba revolt - the third major rebellion by the Jews against Roman rule. After the rebellion failed, emperor Hadrian changed the name of the province from Iudaea to "Syria Palaestina" in order to complete the dissociation between the Jewish rebels and the region.
135–324	The Late Roman period	Roman Empire	Syria Palaestina	260 AD: Short-living Palmyrene Empire emerges in the Levant, splitting from the Roman Empire.; 272 AD: Palmyrene Empire is reannexed to Roman Empire. Syria Palaestina restored as Roman province.
324–638	The Byzantine period	Byzantine Empire	Palaestina I and Palaestina II	326–335:Church of the Nativity is built in Bethlehem and Eleona Basilica and Church of the Holy Sepulchre are built in Jerusalem; 425: Jewish Sanhedrin is dissolved, the last Nasi is executed.; 484: Samaritan revolt erupts in Neapolis, led by Justa (rebel) and shortly defeated.; 529: Julianus ben Sabar leads a large-scale Samaritan revolt against Byzantines, defeated with great losses.; 556: Another large scale revolt by Samaritans and Jews against the Byzantines erupts in Caesarea Maritima, but also defeated.; 614: Persian invasion supported by Jewish rebels; Jerusalem conquered and becomes the administrative center of the Jewish Sassanid Commonwealth.; 628: The area restores to Byzantine rule.; 629: Nearly 150,000 Jews are massacred and expelled by Byzantines from Jerusalem and the Galilee.
638–1099	The Arab Caliphate Period	Rashidun, Umayyad and Abbasid and Fatimid Caliphates	Jund Filastin	638: the conquest of Jerusalem by the armies of the Rashidun Caliphate (Islamic Empire) under Caliph Umar.; 661: The Umayyad Caliphate period.; 750: The Abbasids overthrew the Umayyad Caliphate.; 878: The Tulunids occupied Palestine and Syria, enabling them to defend Egypt against Abbasid attack.; 970: The Fatimids, a self-proclaimed Shia caliphate, took control and appointed a Jewish governor.; 1071: The Seljuk Turks invaded large portions of West Asia, including Asia Minor and Palestine.
1099–1260	The Crusader period and the Ayyubid Period	The Crusaders, Seljuks and Ayyubids	Southern Levant / Kingdom of Jerusalem / Outremer / Palestine / Holy Land	1099: First Crusade and the establishment of the Christian Kingdom of Jerusalem.; 1187: Battle of Hattin between the forces of Saladin and the Crusaders.; 1191: Third Crusade led by the armies of Richard the Lionhearted.
1260–1517	The Mamluk period	The Mamluk	Damascus Wilayah / Filastin	1260: Battle of Ain Jalut between the Egyptian Mamluks and the Mongols which took place in the Jezreel Valley.; 1291: Fall of Acre which resulted in the Crusaders loss of their last major stronghold of the Crusader Kingdom of Jerusalem.
1517–1917	The Ottoman period	Ottoman Empire	Ottoman Syria / Southern Syria / Arz-i-Filistin	1517: conquest of Palestine by the armies of the Turkish Sultan Selim I.; 1538–1535: Suleiman the Magnificent restores the Dome of the Rock in Jerusalem and the Jerusalem city walls (which are the current walls of the Old City of Jerusalem).; 1799: Napoleon Bonaparte's Siege of Acre (Part of the French invasion of Egypt).; 1832–1840: Egyptian conquest of the region by the armies of Ibrahim Pasha of Egypt.
1917–1948	The British Mandate period	British Empire	Mandatory Palestine	Main article: Mandatory Palestine: 1917: British occupation of the region and the beginning of the British Mandate for Palestine.; 1929: the outbreak of the 1929 Palestine riots.; 1936: Beginning of the Arab revolt in Palestine.; 29 November 1947: UN resolution to partition Palestine.
1948 onwards	Modern period	Israel / Egypt / Jordan / Palestinian National Authority / Hamas Government in Gaza	State of Israel / West Bank / Gaza Strip / Palestinian territories / State of Palestine	Main article: History of Israel: 1947–1949: Over 700,000 Palestinian Arabs expelled or flee from their homes, caused by actions of the Zionist paramilitaries before and the Israel Defence Forces after the establishment of the State of Israel.; 1948: Establishment of the State of Israel, Jordanian annexation of the West Bank, Occupation of the Gaza Strip by Egypt and establishment of All-Palestine Government.; 1959: Egypt, Syria and All-Palestine Government united as the United Arab Republic.; 1967: Six-Day War: Israel occupies the Gaza Strip and the Sinai Peninsula from Egypt and the West Bank from Jordan. 280,000 to 325,000 Palestinians displaced from the Gaza Strip and West Bank.; 1973: Yom Kippur War: A coalition of Arab states surprise attacks Israel in an attempt to regain the territories they lost in the Six-Day War.; 1979: Egypt–Israel peace treaty which leads to Israel's complete withdrawal from the Sinai Peninsula.; 1993: Oslo accords, Palestinian Authority is created.; 1994: Israel–Jordan peace treaty.; 2005: Israel's unilateral disengagement plan: Jewish settlements in the Gaza Strip were evacuated.; 2007: Gaza Strip violently splits from Palestinian Authority.

== See also ==
- Archaeology of Israel
- History of ancient Israel and Judah
- History of the Jews and Judaism in the Land of Israel
- History of Palestine (region)
- Palestinian archaeology
- Prehistory of the Levant
- Timeline of the name Palestine
- Timeline of the Palestine region
