= Abu Karib ibn Jabalah =

Ghassanid phylarch, brother of Al-Harith

Abu Karib ibn Jabalah (Greek: Ἀβοχάραβος, Abokharabos) was a 6th-century Arab phylarch and ruler of the Ghassanids in the Roman province of Palestine (Palaestina Salutaris) during the reign of the Byzantine emperor Justinian I. He is primarily known through the writings of the Byzantine historian Procopius, as well as limited epigraphic and papyrological evidence from the region.

== Family and position ==
Abu Karib was a member of the Jafnid (Ghassanid) dynasty, a prominent Arab group allied with the Byzantine Empire. He was the brother of Al-Harith ibn Jabalah (also known as Arethas), a well-documented Jafnid ruler who served as a major military ally to Rome. His father was Jabalah IV ibn al-Harith, the previous ruler of Palaestina Salutaris (from 512 to 529), who bestowed the territory onto Abu Karib.

His authority was recognized both within and beyond the Roman administrative structure. Abu Karib is mentioned in a Sabaic inscription from South Arabia and appears in a Syriac manuscript concerning the history of the Monophysites. Additionally, a Greek papyrus found at Petra, dated to August 574, records an arbitration where "Abu Cherebos" the phylarch made a determination regarding a vineyard dispute, illustrating his continued judicial or administrative influence in the region. Abu Karib is also named in a lintel inscription on a church found at the village of Sammāʾ, reflecting public associations between the Janifs and Christianity.

== Crushing the Samaritan rebellion ==
A major Samaritan revolt broke out in 529–531 under the leadership of a charismatic, messianic claimant named Julianus ben Sabar (or ben Sahir), sometimes referred to as the final Samaritan revolt, to create an independent state. According to Procopius, the violence erupted due to restrictions imposed on Samaritans by the Byzantine authorities via Justinian's edicts, while Cyril of Scythopolis indicates sectarian tensions between Christians and Samaritans as the primary cause for the revolt.

Following massive riots in Scythopolis and the countryside, the rebels quickly conquered Neapolis, and ben Sabar emerged as their king. Ben Sabar followed a strict anti-Christian policy: Neapolis' bishop and many priests were murdered, and he persecuted the Christians, destroyed churches and organized guerrilla warfare in the countryside, driving the Christians away. As a response, forces of the dux Palaestinae, combined with units of local governors and Abu Karib were dispatched to deal with the uprising. Ben Sabar was surrounded and defeated after withdrawing with his forces from Neapolis. After his capture, he was beheaded, and his head, crowned with a diadem, was sent to Emperor Justinian.

By 531 the rebellion had been put down. The forces of Emperor Justinian I quelled the revolt with the help of the Ghassanid Arabs under the leadership of Abu Karib; Abu Karib killed or enslaved tens of thousands of Samaritans, with their death-toll possibly being between 20,000 and 100,000. The Byzantine Empire thereafter virtually outlawed the Samaritan faith. According to Procopius of Caesarea, the majority of Samaritan peasants chose to be defiant in this revolt and "were cut to pieces". Further, Samaria, the "world's most fertile land, was left with no one to till it".

== The Palm Grove affair ==
Abu Karib is most famous for his role in the formal transfer of a region known as the "Palm Grove" (Greek: Phoinikōn) to the Roman Empire. According to Procopius in his works Wars and Buildings, Abu Karib presented this territory to the emperor Justinian as a gift. In return, Justinian officially bestowed upon him the title of phylarch over the Arabs in Palestine.

Procopius describes the Palm Grove as a vast interior region where only palm trees grew, settled by Saracens since ancient times. However, some historian note that Roman "possession" of the land was largely symbolic; the territory was separated from Roman Palestine by a ten-day journey through a completely dry, uninhabited desert, making it (according to Procopius) impossible for the Emperor to exercise real control over the area.

=== Geographic identification of the Palm Grove ===
The exact location of Abu Karib's Palm Grove remains a subject of scholarly debate, as the commentary by Procopius is somewhat vague. While early writers like Cosmas Indicopleustes placed it in the Sinai Peninsula, and others suggested locations as far south as Mecca, modern scholars generally look to the northestern Hejaz. The three main candidates are Tabuk (accepted by Irfan Shahîd, an important oasis on the route from the Arabian Peninsula to Syria), Hegra (Mada'in Salih, a former Nabataean stronghold with extensive evidence of date palm cultivation and a confirmed Roman military presence up to the fourth century), and Tayma (an ancient oasis with significant water management systems and agricultural activity).
