= Justa (rebel) =

Leader in the 484 Samaritan revolt

Justa (or Justasa and Justasus) was elected by Samaritans as their king during the 484 AD Samaritan revolt. Following his ascent in Samaria, he moved on Caesarea, where a noteworthy Samaritan community lived. There, many Christians were killed and the church of St. Procopius was destroyed. Justa celebrated the victory with games in the circus.

According to John Malalas, Asclepiades, the dux Palaestinae (commander of the province's Limes Arabicus troops), whose units were reinforced by the Caesarea-based Arcadiani of lestodioktes (police chief) Rheges, defeated Justa, killed him and sent his head to the Eastern Roman Emperor Zeno.

== See also ==
- Baba Rabba
- Julianus ben Sabar
