= Khirbet Samara =

Archaeological site in the West Bank

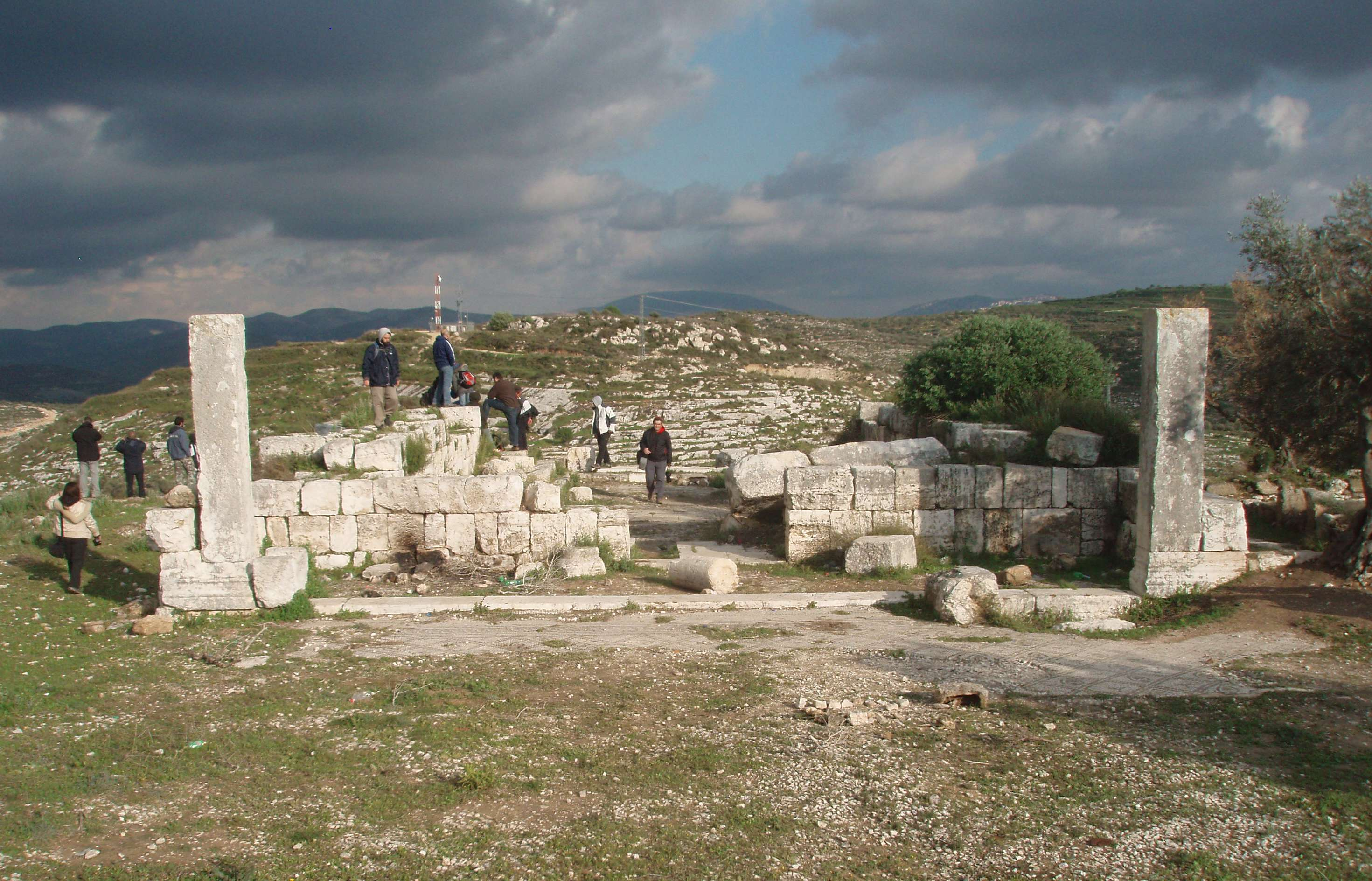
- The Samaritan synagogue at Khirbet Samara

- Location within the West Bank
- 32.279194°N 35.11495°E
- Type: settlement, synagogue
- Periods: Roman to Byzantine period
- Cultures: Samaritan
- Location: West Bank

Site notes
- Area: 30 acres (12 ha)
- Excavation dates: 1991-2
- Archaeologists: Yitzhak Magen
- Condition: In ruins

Khirbet Samara (Hebrew: ח'ירבת סמארה) is an archaeological site located in the West Bank. It lies near the Israeli settlement of Einav, 9 km east of Taibe.

The site was first surveyed by the Palestine Exploration Fund in the late 19th century, and was then mistakenly identified as a church. In excavations conducted by Israeli archeologist Yitzhak Magen in 1991–1992, the structure on the eastern edge of the site was identified as a Samaritan synagogue. In addition, a mikveh, a cistern, an arched gate, burial caves and public structures were found at the site.

== Samaritan synagogue ==
The Samaritan synagogue was built in the 4th century CE. An imposing building built in an east–west direction, it faces Mount Gerizim, the holiest site in Samaritanism. The internal dimensions of the synagogue are 15 meters long and 8.4 meters wide and its area is 126 square meters. It has five parts: a central hall, a narthex, a round atrium, a courtyard and rooms to the east and south. The hall, which features a classical floor mosaic, was surrounded by two rows of theatre-style benches. Two pillars stand at the entrance to the building.

The synagogue reuses the ashlar masonry of an earlier Roman public structure, which was discovered beneath it. In the middle of the eastern wall, facing Mount Gerizim, an apse was built. The apse was built later than the rest of the synagogue, probably in the 5th century CE. A large stone with a relief of a Torah ark was carved east of the apse; its shape is similar to the facades of Torah arks discovered in Jewish synagogues.

The synagogue's construction might be related to Baba Rabba, a Samaritan High Priest who is said to have re-opened and built synagogues throughout Samaria. The synagogue was probably abandoned following the Samaritan Revolts and may have been destroyed in a fire. At the end of the Byzantine period or the beginning of the early Islamic period, an attempt was made to renew it, and stone slabs were then placed on top of the mosaic.

=== Samara mosaic ===
The Samara mosaic was made of tessera stones of many colors: white, black, gray, red, purple, pink, brown, orange, mustard, yellow, light blue, turquoise (maybe glass), gray-green and beige. The high density of the stones from the mosaic, which stands at 400 stones for each square decimeter, is considered rare and ranks one of the highest created in the region during the Byzantine period.

The carpet of the main hall of the synagogue is divided into two square panels surrounded by frames of medallions of azalea leaves. The pacifier medallions are populated with designs of agricultural crops, tools and objects. The design is uniquely naturalistic and accurate. The northern row was adorned with a branch bearing almonds, sheaves of wheat, grapevine twigs modeled on a tripod, a branch bearing pomegranates, olive branches, figs on a branch, a jug pouring red wine into a saucer and branches bearing red roses around it. The middle row of medallions between the two rugs depicts date palm trees, palm panicle and a sickle. The medallions in the southern row include a branch of apricots, a branch of peaches and a branch of Pinus pinea bearing several pine cones.

The mosaic was taken from its site for the purpose of preservation; it is now on display in the Good Samaritan Museum near Ma'ale Adumin.

== Photo gallery ==
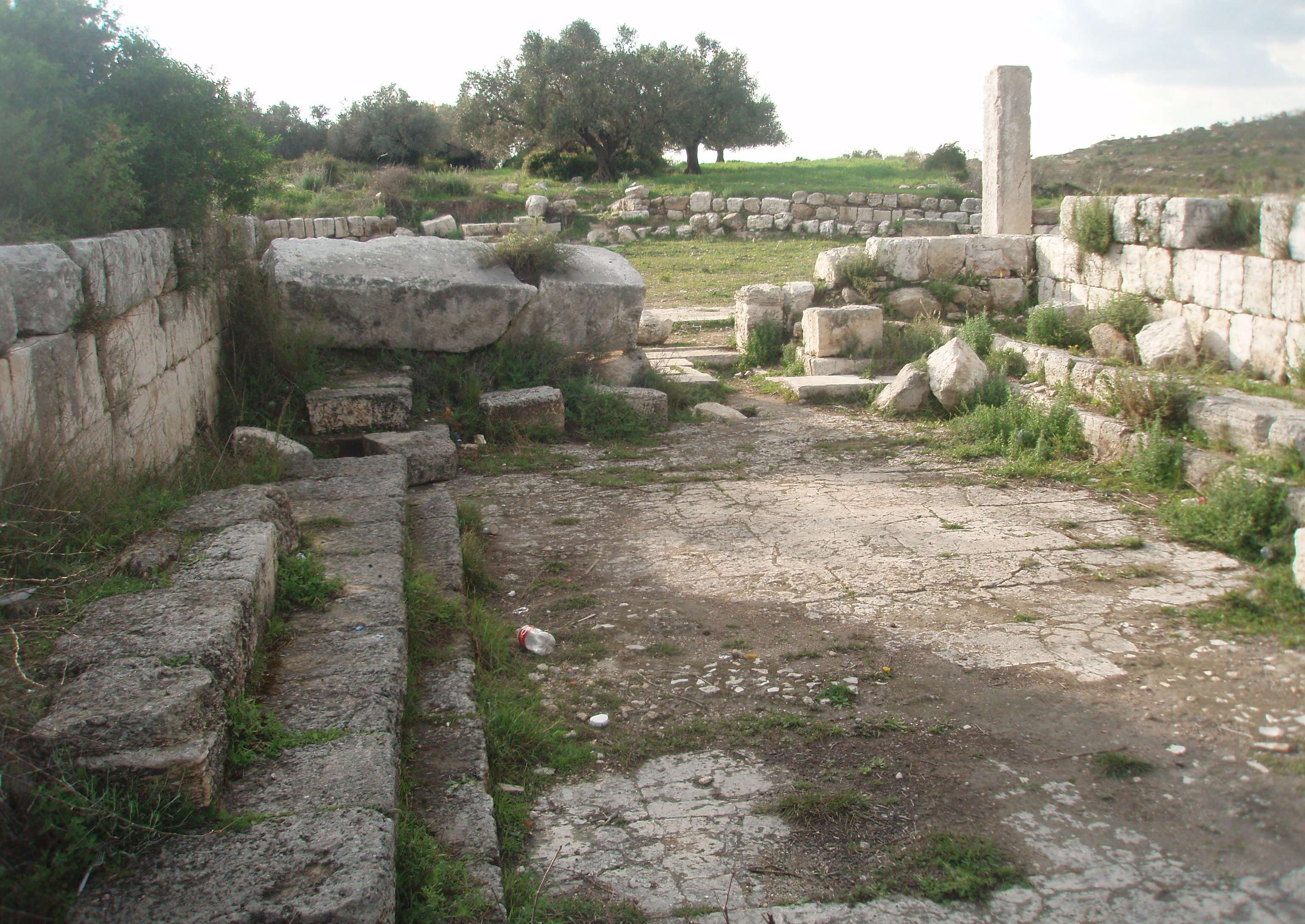
Synagogue interior

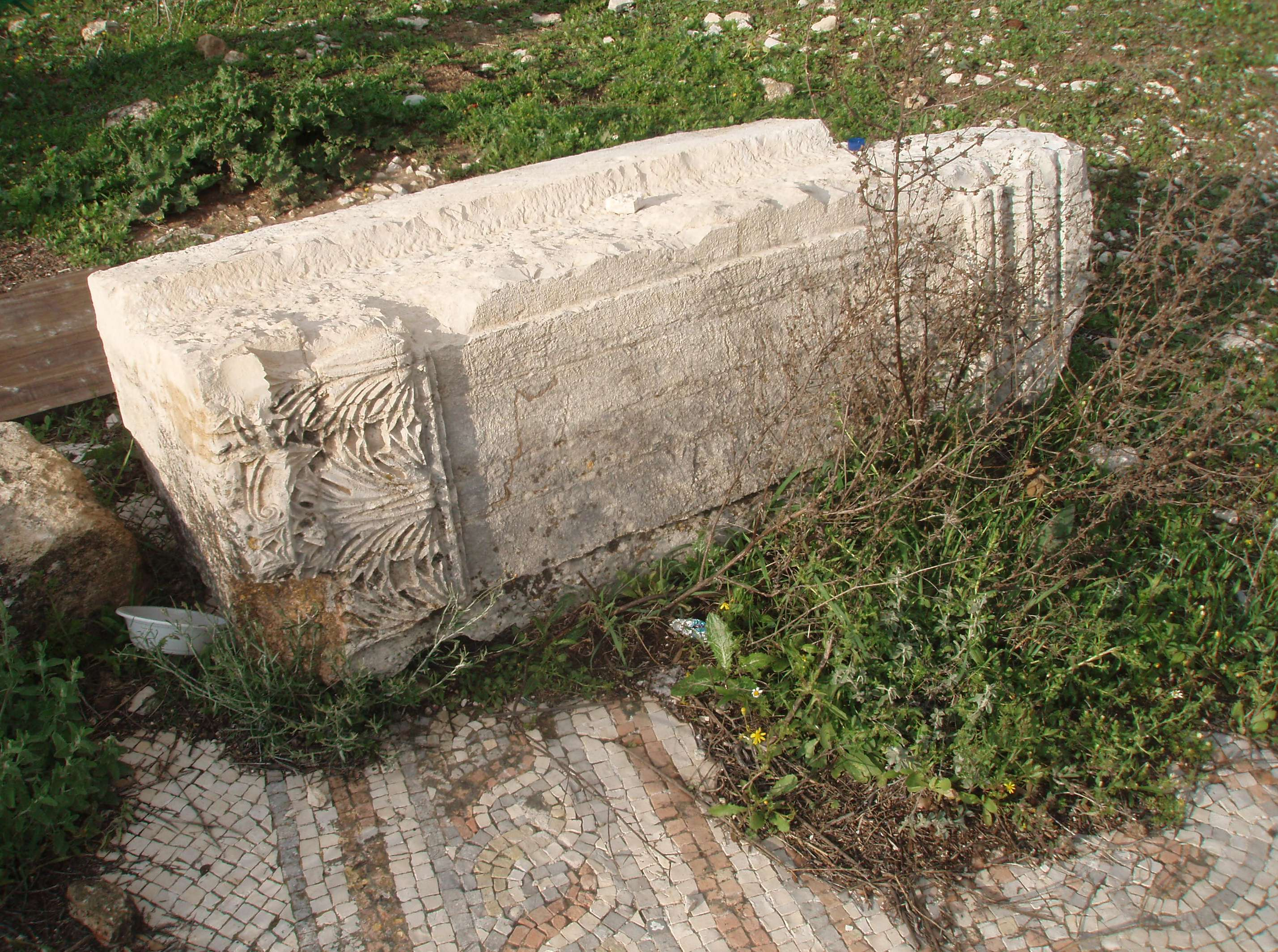
Architectural remains

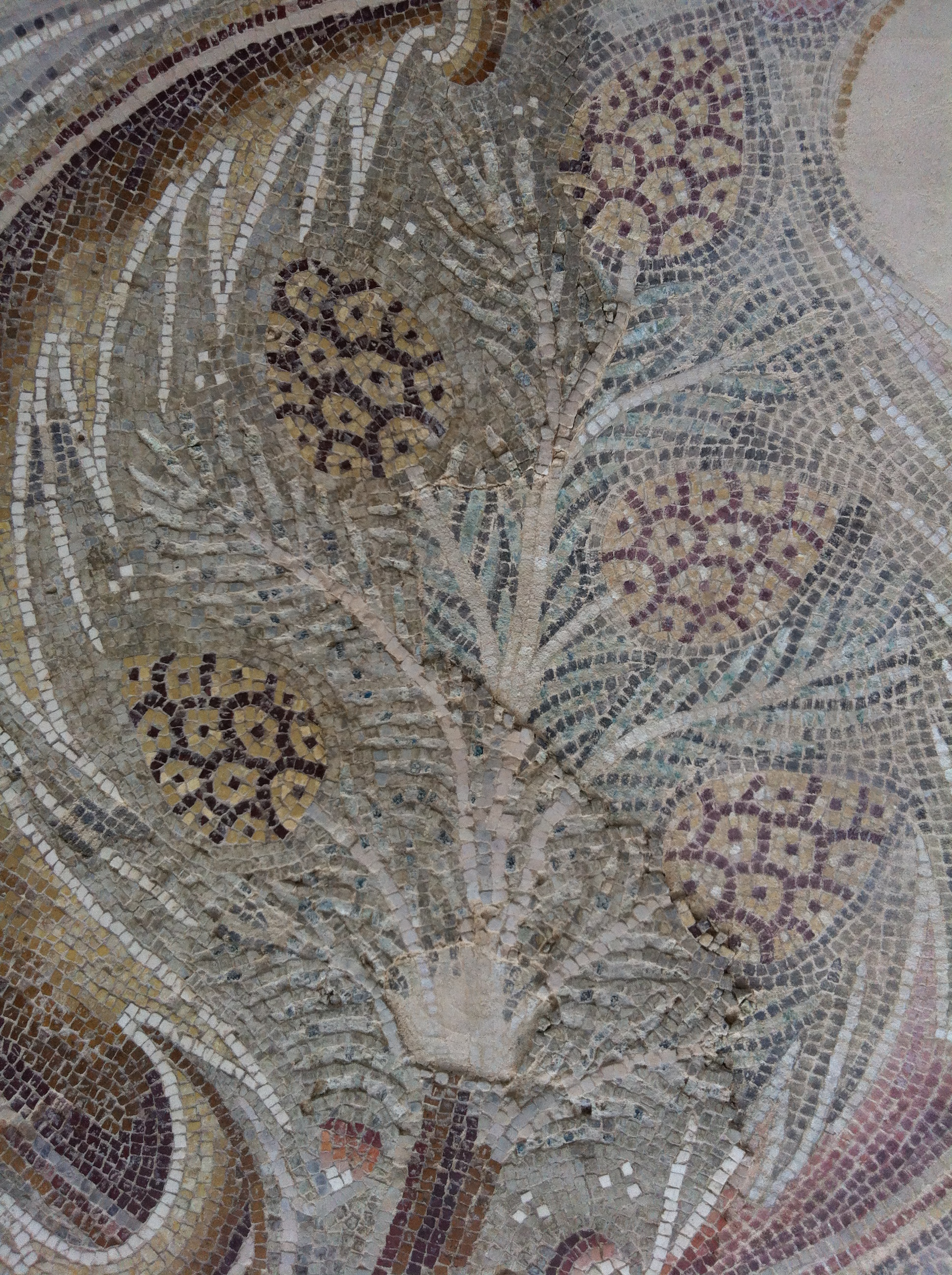
Samara mosaic: branch of pine cones

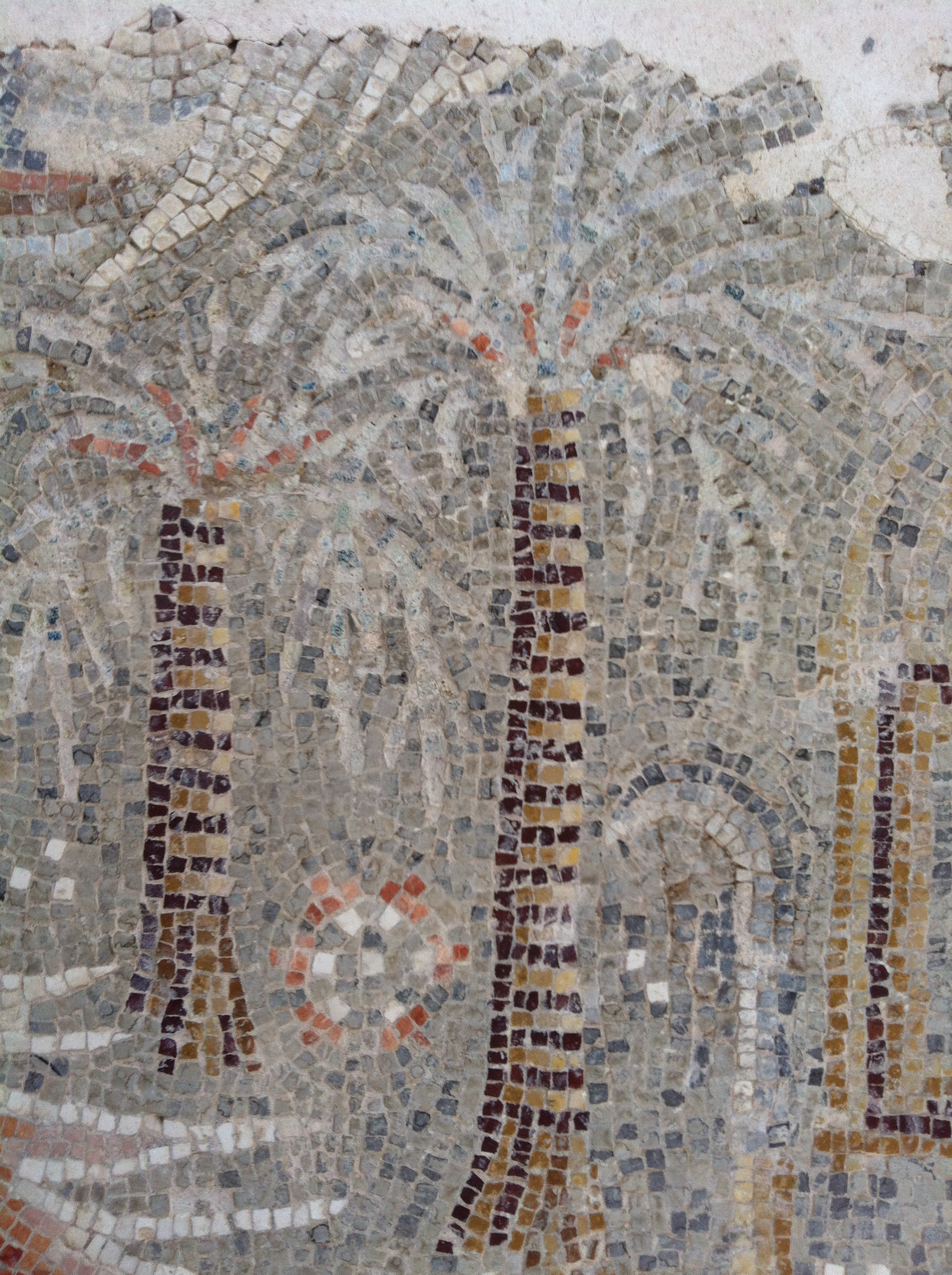
Palm trees

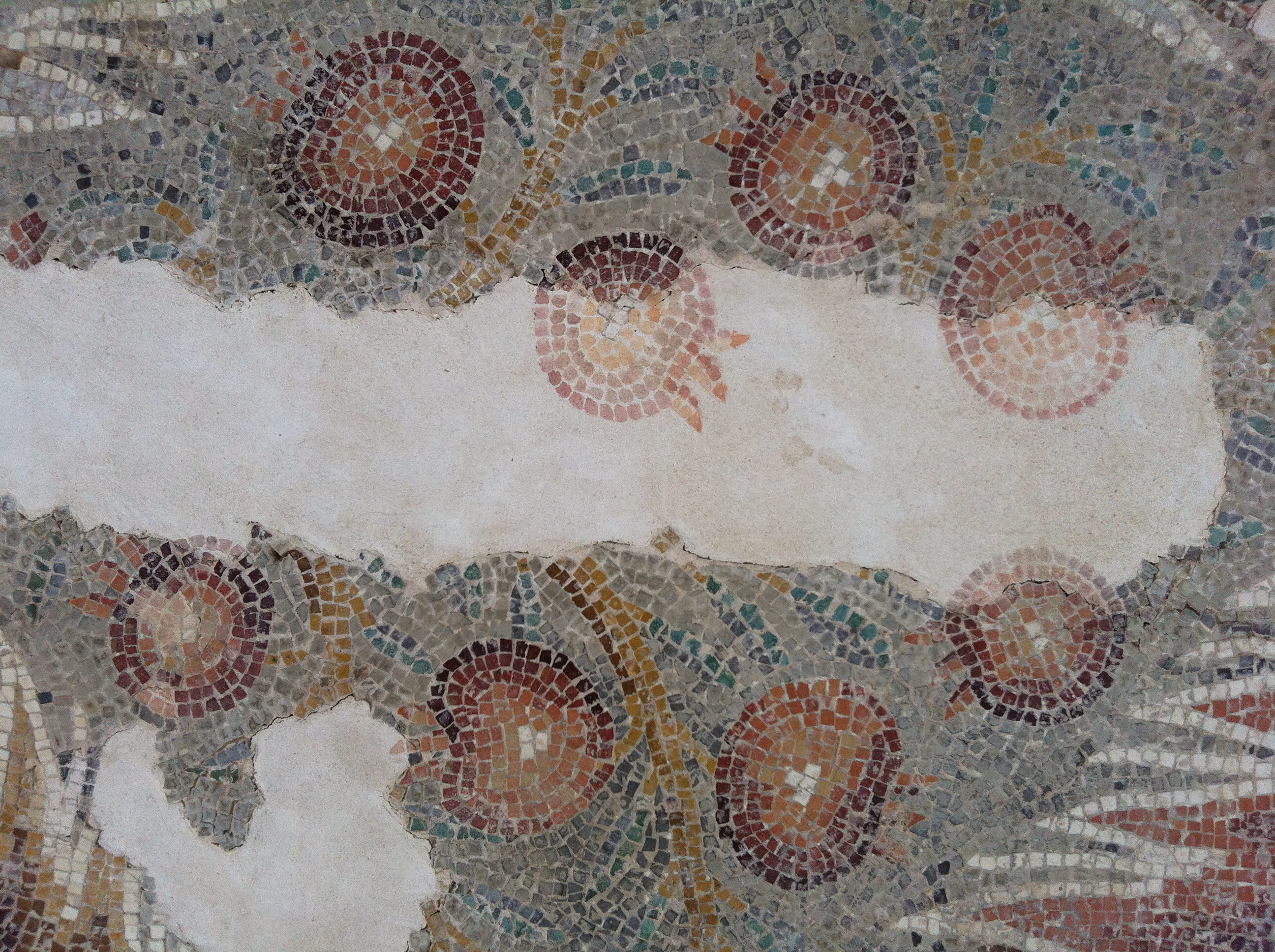
Pomegranates

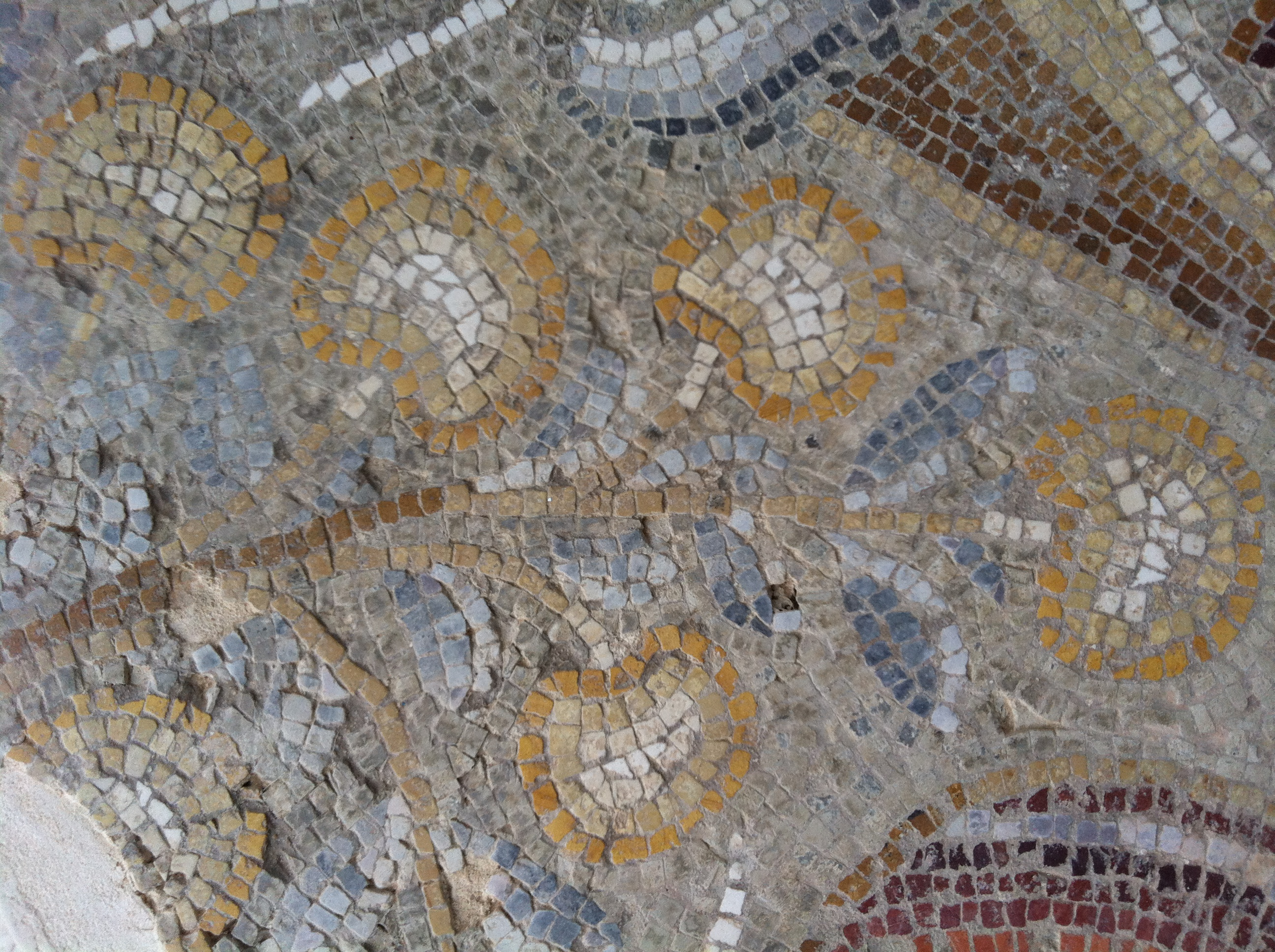
Branch of apricots

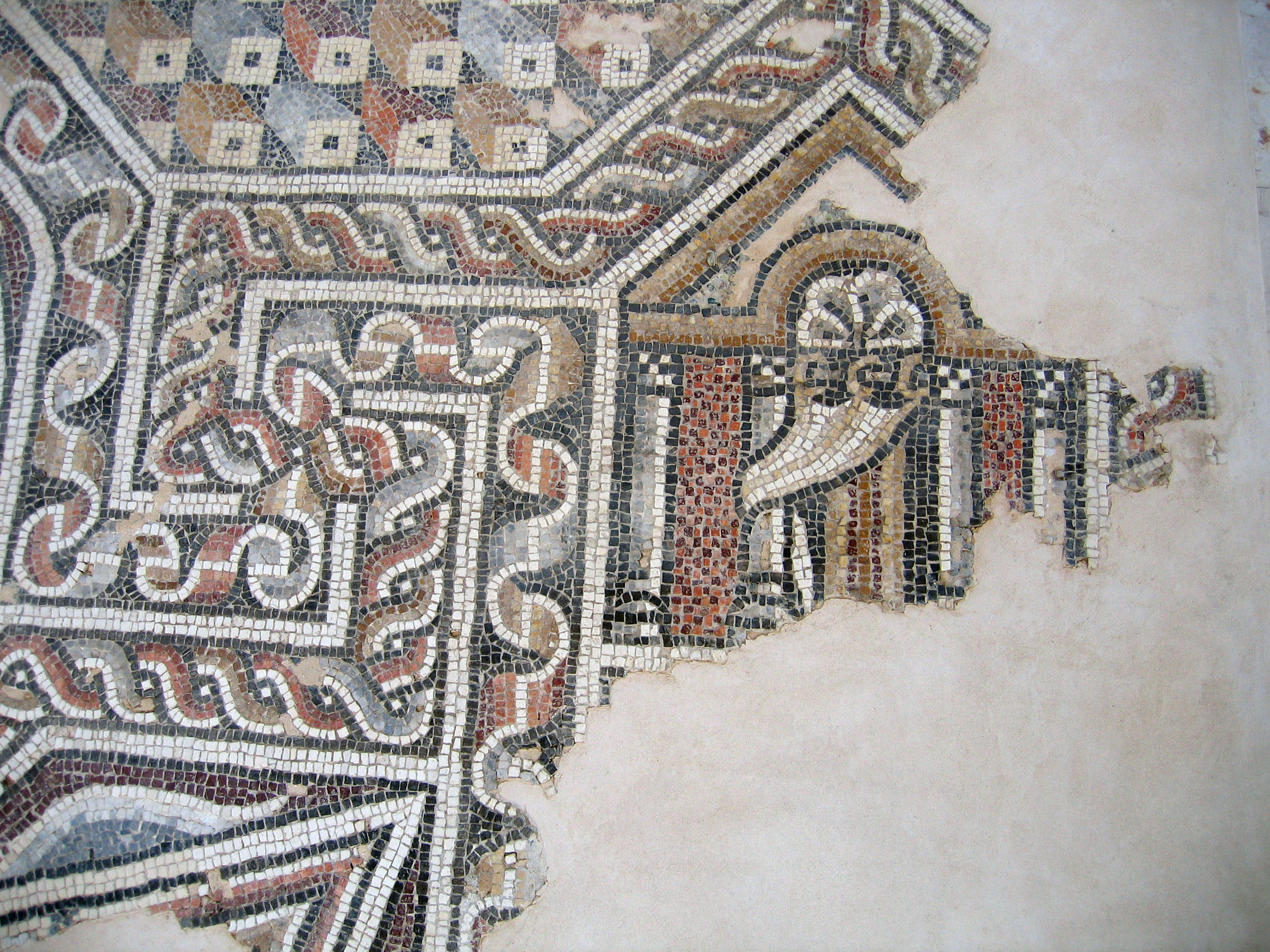
Synagogue ark

== See also ==
- Archaeology of Israel
- Inn of the Good Samaritan
- Samaritanism
- El-Khirbe
- Tzur Natan#Archaeology

== Bibliography ==
- Conder, C.R.; Kitchener, H.H. (1882). The Survey of Western Palestine: Memoirs of the Topography, Orography, Hydrography, and Archaeology. Vol. 2. London: Committee of the Palestine Exploration Fund.
- Palmer, E.H. (1881). The Survey of Western Palestine: Arabic and English Name Lists Collected During the Survey by Lieutenants Conder and Kitchener, R. E. Transliterated and Explained by E.H. Palmer. Committee of the Palestine Exploration Fund.
