= Hauara =

Hauara was an ancient episcopal see in Palestina Tertia, a suffragan of Petra.

== Location ==
This Hauara, situated between Aila and Petra, is certainly distinct from the Hauara of Stephen of Byzantium, the Leuke kome of the Greeks, a harbour of the Red Sea; but it has been impossible to discover its location. It is unknown even when it became a titular see, because it formerly had no bishop, and does not figure in any episcopal Notitiae.

The Tabula Peutingeriana locates a place of this name thirty-eight miles of Petra (see Clermont-Ganneau in "Revue biblique", N.S. III, 419–421). The city is also mentioned by Ptolemy (V, 16) and by the Notitia dignitatum (ed. Boecking, 79), which mentions the garrison of equites sagittarri indigenae.

At one time it was reckoned as a Catholic titular see, but it is no longer included among the titular sees listed in the Annuario Pontificio.
