= Palaestina Salutaris =

Roman/Byzantine province (c.300-636)

Palaestina III Salutaris Ἐπαρχία Παλαιστίνη Τρίτη
- Province of the Byzantine Empire, Diocese of the East
- c. 358–636
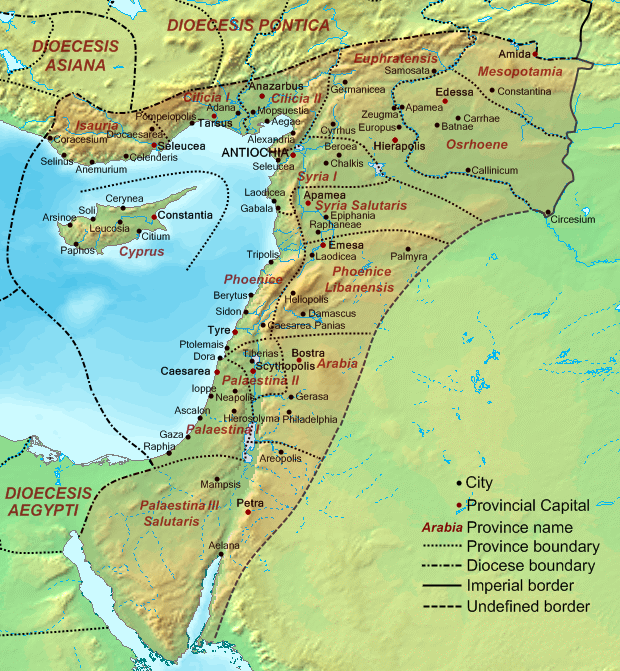
- Palaestina Salutaris within the Diocese of the East, in 400 CE
- Capital: Petra
- Historical era: Late Antiquity
  - Established: c. 358
  - Persian occupation: 612–628
  - Muslim conquest of Syria: 636
Preceded by	Succeeded by
Petra	Bilad al-Sham

Palaestina Salutaris or Palaestina Tertia (sometimes also Palaestina Tertia Salutaris) was a Late Roman and Byzantine province, which covered the area of the Negev, Sinai (except the north-western coast) and south-west of Transjordan, south of the Dead Sea. The province, a part of the Diocese of the East, was created from territories formerly belonging to the provinces of Syria Palaestina (the name given after 135 to the former province of Judaea) and Arabia Petraea (the former Nabataean Kingdom): first, in c. 300 CE, the Negev, Sinai and Southern Transjordan were transferred from Arabia Petraea to Syria Palaestina during the reforms of Diocletian; and then, around 357-358, Syria Palaestina was split in two, into southern Palestine, later to become known as Palaestina Salutaris, and the remaining northern territory being named Palaestina Prima. The province of Palaestina Salutaris existed until the Muslim conquests of the 7th century.

== Background ==
In 106, the territories east of Damascus and south to the Red Sea were annexed from the Nabataean Kingdom and reformed into the province of Arabia with capitals Petra and Bostra (south and north). The province was enlarged by Septimius Severus in 195, and is believed to have split into two provinces: Arabia Minor or Arabia Petraea and Arabia Maior, both subject to imperial legates ranking as consularis, each with a legion.

By the 3rd century, the Nabataeans had stopped writing in Aramaic and begun writing in Greek instead, and by the 4th century they had partially converted to Christianity, a process completed in the 5th century.

Petra declined rapidly under late Roman rule, in large part from the revision of sea-based trade routes. The 363 Galilee earthquake destroyed many buildings and crippled the vital water management system.

The area became organized under the late Roman Empire as part of the Diocese of the East (314), in which it was included together with the provinces of Isauria, Cilicia, Cyprus (until 536), Euphratensis, Mesopotamia, Osroene, Phoenice and Arabia Petraea.

Byzantine rule in the 4th century introduced Christianity to the population. Agricultural-based cities were established, and the population grew exponentially. Under Byzantium (since 390), a new subdivision further split the province of Cilicia into Cilicia Prima, Cilicia Secunda; Syria into Syria Prima, Syria Salutaris, and Phoenice Lebanensis; and Syria Palaestina (the former province of Judaea) into Palaestina Prima, Palaestina Secunda and eventually also Palaestina Salutaris (in the 6th century).

== History ==
During the 4th through 6th centuries, Palaestina Tertia underwent a significant process of Arabization, evolving into a virtual vassal state under Byzantine influence. This transition was driven by the migration of the Ghassanids (Jafnids), a Christian Arab group that moved from the Arabian Peninsula into the southern Levant in the 3rd century. By the 4th century, the Ghassanids had established a presence in Palaestina Salutaris, eventually converting to Monophysite Christianity.

The Byzantine administration integrated these communities through a patron-client system, granting leading Arab princes the title of phylarch. These leaders served as foederati, providing military contingents in exchange for settlement rights and subsidies. Unlike Roman citizens, they maintained a distinct status as treaty-bound allies. By 530 AD, individual phylarchs were subordinated to a supreme Ghassanid phylarch or "king," appointed directly by the Byzantine Emperor.

=== Rulers ===
The first notable supreme phylarch associated with the region was Imru' al-Qays (Amorkesos), who signed a treaty with the emperor Leo I in the 5th century. He was granted authority over Palaestina Tertia, establishing a power base in the former Nabataean regions. In the 6th century, the system reached its height under the brothers Abu Karib ibn Jabalah and Al-Harith ibn Jabalah (Arethas). Abu Karib was appointed by Justinian I as the supreme phylarch of Palaestina Tertia in 529 AD, he controlled the Negev and northern Hejaz. He was responsible for securing lucrative trade routes, including the frankincense trade, and acted as a high-ranking diplomat. Al-Harith ibn Jabalah was based primarily in Palaestina Secunda and Arabia holdingthe titles of patrikios and vir gloriosissimus. He served as the overall commander of all Arab foederati in the East. Under these rulers, Palaestina Tertia functioned as a client state. The Ghassanids maintained their own armies, collected taxes, and pursued semi-autonomous foreign policies, even dispatching their own ambassadors to distant powers like the Himyarite Kingdom in South Arabia.

=== Military and religious role ===
The Ghassanids acted as a vital buffer zone, protecting the "Three Palestines" from raids by the Sassanid-allied Lakhmids. Their military presence ensured the security of Christian pilgrimage routes to the Holy Land. As "soldiers of Christ" (milites Christi), they were also significant patrons of the Monophysite Church, sponsoring the construction of numerous monasteries and churches.

=== Fall ===
This Ghassanid administrative and military structure remained the dominant force in Palaestina Tertia until the Byzantine defeat at the Battle of Yarmuk in 636 AD, which led to the Islamic conquest of the region.

== Selected list of rulers ==
- Jabalah IV ibn al-Harith
- Abu Karib ibn Jabalah

== See also ==
- Byzantine Palestine
- Hauara

== Works cited ==
- Masalha, Nur (2018). Palestine: A Four Thousand Year History. Zed Books.
