= El-Khirbe =

Archaeological site in the West Bank

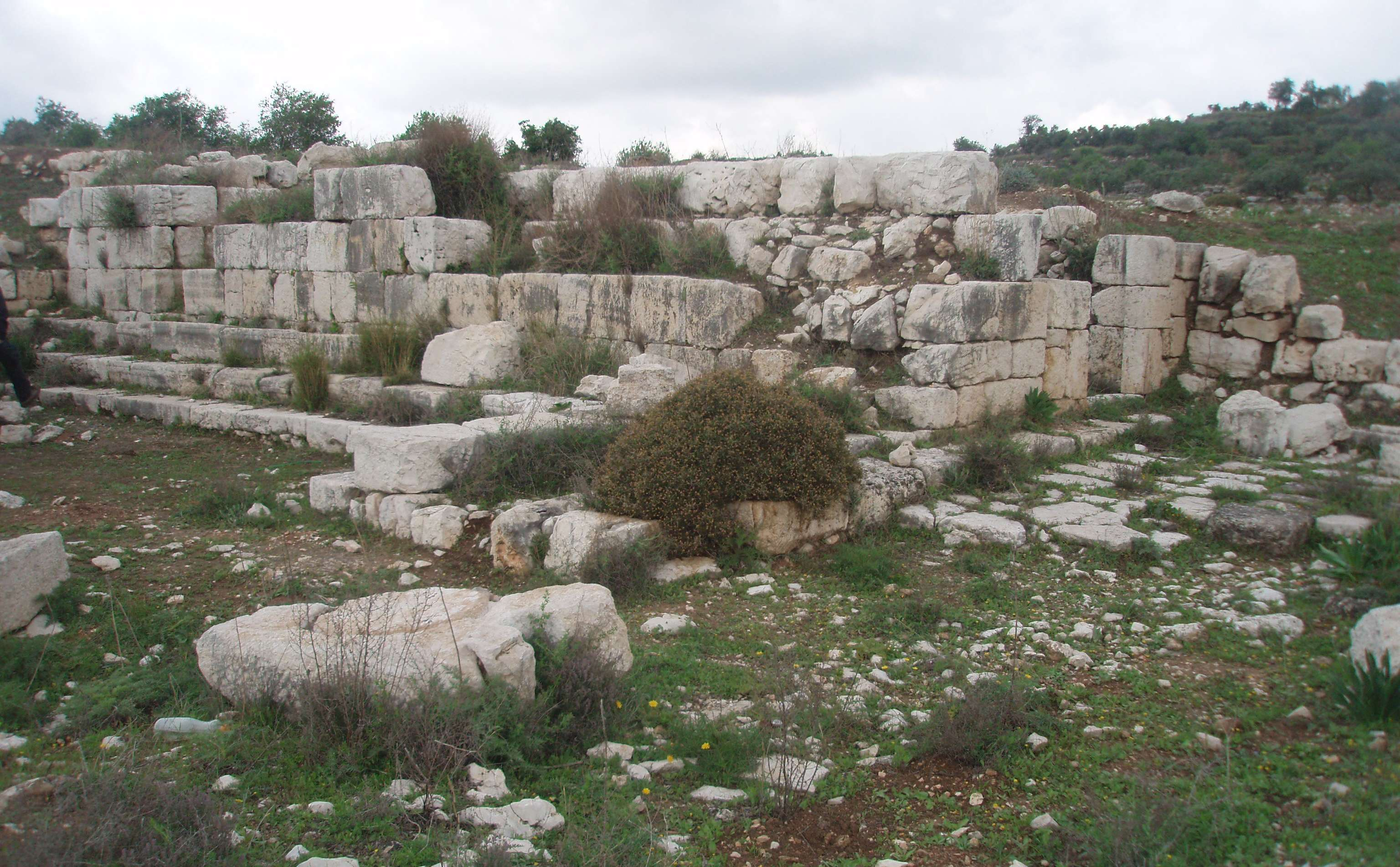
- Ruins at El-Khirbe

- Location within the West Bank
- 32.25362°N 35.17850°E
- Type: synagogue, mausoleum, agricultural installations
- Periods: Roman to early Islamic period
- Cultures: Samaritan
- Location: West Bank
- Region: Samaria

Site notes
- Area: 1.2 acres (0.49 ha)

El-Khirbe is an archaeological site in the Samarian hills of the modern-day West Bank. The site includes the remains of a Roman-era estate and mausoleum, a Samaritan synagogue from Late Antiquity, and associated agricultural installations.

The synagogue was built in the 4th century CE and went out of use in the 5th–6th centuries, likely as a result of imperial Byzantine measures following the Samaritan revolts. It was restored in the 7th century and remained in use until the early Islamic period. Excavations have uncovered several Greek inscriptions and a colorful mosaic, devoid of human and animal figures, depicting symbols such as the menorah, a temple façade, and the table of showbread.

== Geography ==
El-Khirbe extends over roughly 0.5 hectares (1.2 acres) and lies about 2.5 kilometers southwest of Sebastia, near the road linking Nablus and Tulkarm.

== History ==
The site seems to have originally functioned as a Roman agricultural estate, which also contained an oil press and a mausoleum.

In the 4th century CE the Samaritans converted part of the complex into a synagogue, re-using stone from the earlier Roman estate. The building went out of use in the late 5th and 6th centuries, during the reigns of Zeno (474–491) and Justinian (527–565), likely as a result of punitive measures imposed by the Byzantine authorities after the Samaritan revolts. These uprisings, which broke out several times in the 5th and 6th centuries, brought severe repression of the Samaritan community and may have included expulsions. The synagogue was restored in the 7th century, and coins indicate that it remained in use into the early Islamic period.

== Roman-era mausoleum ==
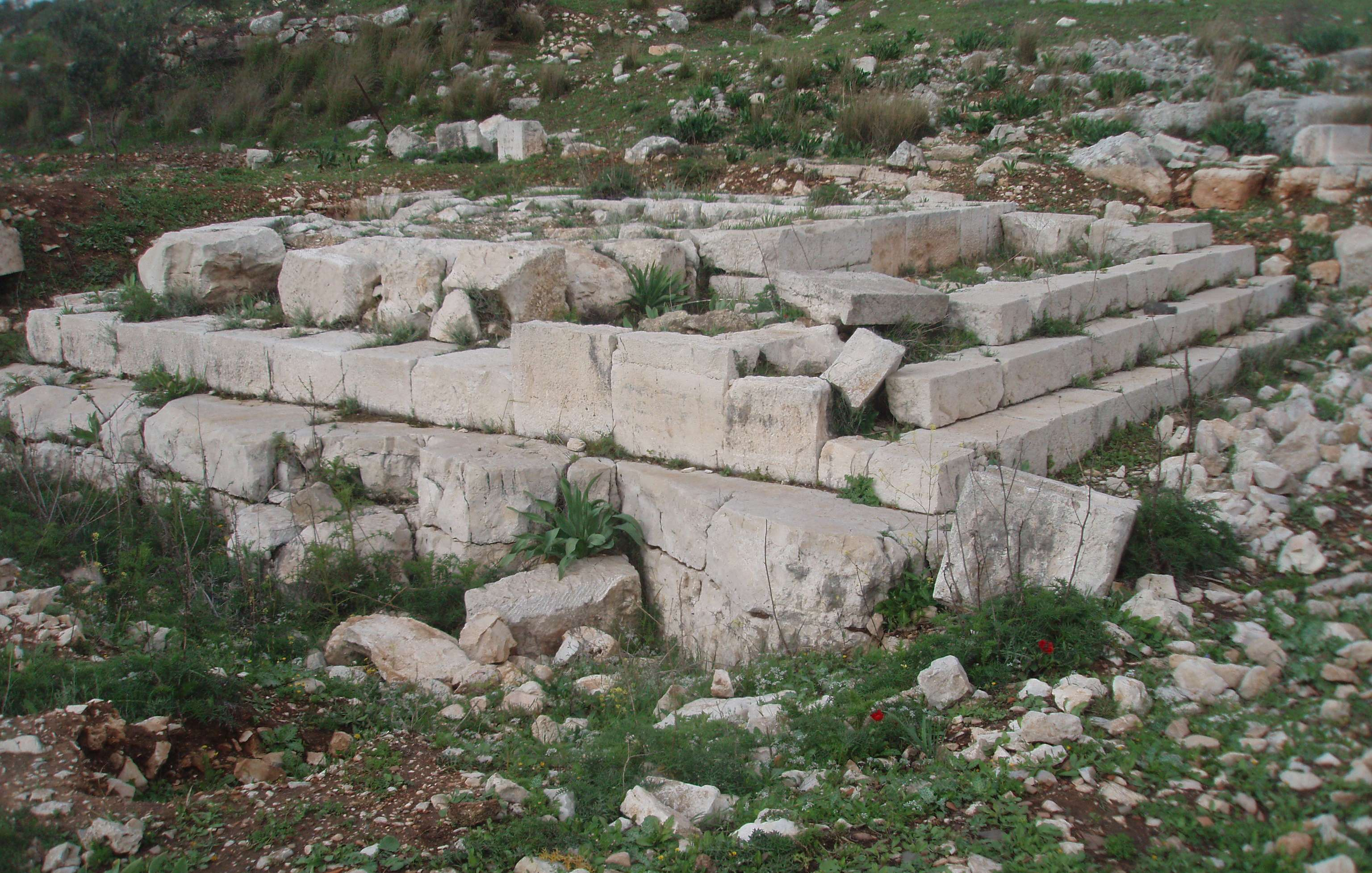
Foundations of a Roman-period mausoleum at El-Khirbe

On the site's southwestern edge, approximately 25m south of the synagogue, stands a Roman-period, temple-shaped mausoleum constructed from well-dressed stone blocks. Once a prominent structure, the mausoleum has been reduced almost entirely to its foundations.

The mausoleum's monumental character suggests that it was intended as the family tomb of the estate's owner and reflects considerable wealth and social standing. In the central chamber, a plastered pit sealed with part of a sarcophagus was found containing human bones and funerary items such as pottery, lamps, jars, and glassware. It is possible that the remains were reburied there after the sarcophagi were removed, perhaps in order to mitigate concerns of ritual impurity due to the mausoleum's closeness to the synagogue.

== Samaritan synagogue ==
The Samaritan synagogue, oriented westwards toward Mount Gerizim—the holiest site in Samaritanism—comprised a central hall, a long exedra on the north side, and courtyards to the south and at the entrance; the latter was probably surrounded by columns in antiquity. The main hall measured 14 × 12 meters externally and 12 × 8.3 meters internally, with thick side walls up to 1.8 metres. Benches lined all four sides of the hall in two tiers, though some were removed when an additional wall was inserted, probably to support a barrel-vaulted roof. An entrance on the north wall connected the main hall to the exedra, whose floor was paved with a mosaic inscription.

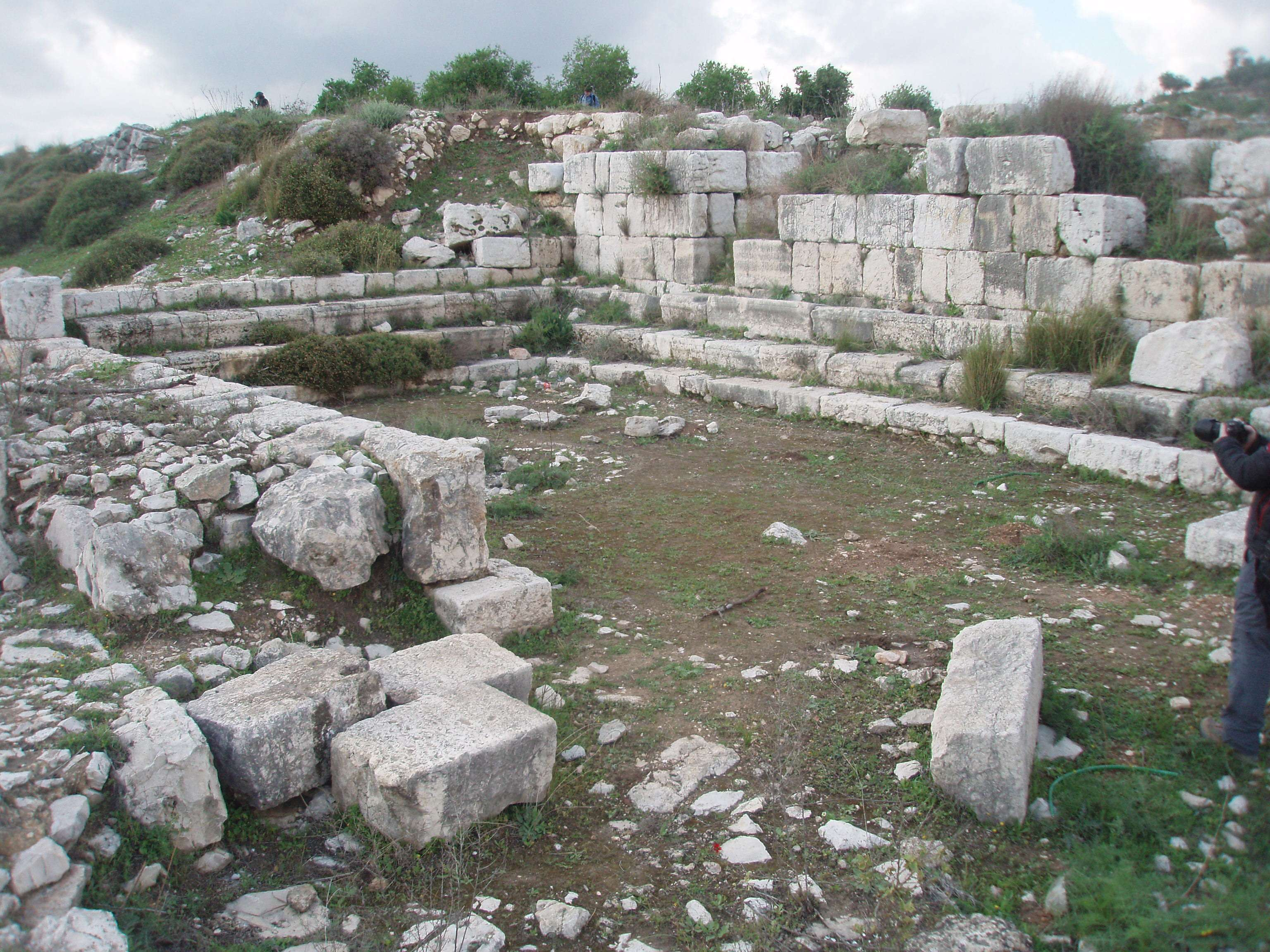
Overview of the Samaritan synagogue

=== Mosaics ===
The mosaic floor of the central hall, covering about 45 square meters (approximately 484 square feet), was laid with relatively large tesserae measuring 8–10 millimeters. Though only partly preserved, the decoration was elaborate. In keeping with other Samaritan synagogues, it avoided images of people or animals; instead, it featured geometric frames and plant motifs, among them a branch with pomegranates, together with a rich set of religious images. These depicted a Torah shrine with four columns, a gable, and conch, fronted by a curtain tied to one side; a seven-branched menorah about 1.8 meters high with stylized blossoms and branches ending in lamps; a table with bowls, goblets, and loaves of bread; a large incense shovel (mafṭa); tong-like utensils; and two trumpets (not shofars, which were not part of Samaritan ritual).

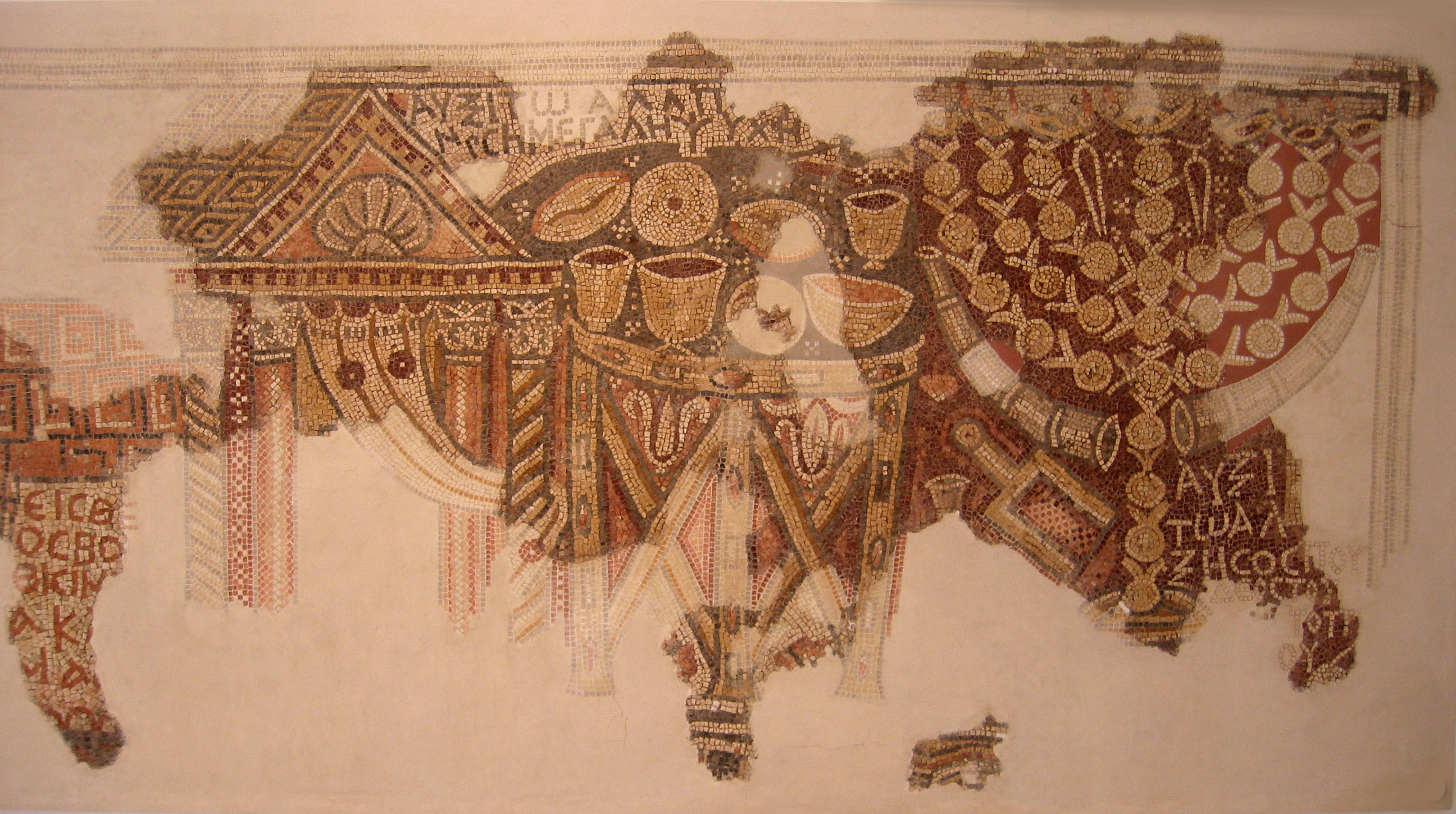
Central panel of the mosaic floor from the El-Khirbe synagogue, now displayed in the Good Samaritan Museum

According to archaeologist Yitzhak Magen writing in 1993, the El-Khirbe mosaic is "one of the earliest mosaics discovered so far in Eretz Israel." He observes that it is uncertain whether the synagogue's symbols—some previously known only from Jewish contexts—represent borrowing from Jewish artistic traditions or the emergence of a distinct Samaritan style. It also remains unclear whether synagogues such as El-Khirbe continue an earlier, as yet unidentified, Samaritan cultic tradition or were modeled on Jewish synagogue architecture.

=== Inscriptions ===
Seven inscriptions were found: six within the mosaics and one carved on the lintel of the entrance. The mosaic inscriptions are divided into two phases, dating to the late 3rd–early 4th century and to the 4th–5th century. All are in Greek. The names are either Greek or Arabic (Alaphion is mentioned explicitly as being so).

The earlier group consists of honorific or dedicatory formulas, such as the blessing "Prosper, Marinus, with your children!", which likely commemorated donors linked to the synagogue’s construction. This interpretation is supported by the placement of the text within a round medallion at the center of the western panel. The later inscriptions differ in character, consisting mainly of direct invocations to God. Examples include "Only God, help Sophronius [son] of Frontius!" and other short prayers naming individuals. One text may preserve the word "place" or "holy place," possibly in reference to the synagogue itself.

No.	Greek text	Translation
1	Εὐτύχ(ει) / Μαρῖνε / μετὰ τῶ- / ν τέκν- / ων.	Prosper, Marinus, with your children!
2	Αὐξίτω Ἀλαφ[φίο-] / νος ἡ μεγάλη ψυχή.	Be exalted, the great soul of Alaphion!
3	Αὐξί- / τω Ἀλέ- / ξης ὁ σ[--] / [..]ος τοῦ-- / [-]τοπο- / υ.	Be exalted, Alexas, the … of this place.
4	Εἷς Θε- / ὸς, βο- / ήθ(ει) Σοφ- / ρονίου / Φροντί- / νου[ν].	Only God, help Sophronius [son] of Frontius!
5	Εἷς Θε[ὸ-]ς, βοή- / θι Σιν[τι-] / ακ[οῦ ?] / Μα[ρ-] / εος.	Only God, help Sintiacus (?) [son] of Mares (?)
6	Εἷς Θε- / ὸς, βοή- / [θ]ι Ἀθ- / [έμο]υ.	Only God, help Ath[emos]!
7	[Εἷς θεὸς βοή]θι Ἀννιανοῦ καὶ Σεμε(οῦ) τῶν [ἀδελφῶν ?].	[Only God, help] the [brothers] Annianus and Shammay.

The mosaic floors uncovered at El-Khirbe are now preserved in the Good Samaritan Museum, a mosaic museum near Ma'ale Adumim in the central West Bank. They are displayed together with mosaics from other Samaritan synagogues, including those of Khirbet Samara and Sha'alvim, alongside examples from ancient Jewish synagogues and churches.

== Other findings ==
=== Agricultural estate ===
At the center of the site lies a Roman-era agricultural estate dating to the 2nd–3rd centuries CE. The complex includes the remains of a large oil press, along with adjacent structures, ritual baths, and stone pillars.

=== Coinage ===
A total of 49 coins were recovered at El-Khirbe, most of them from the synagogue precinct, with some found near the adjacent mausoleum. The earliest piece dates to the reign of Diocletian in 296 CE, while the majority belong to the late Roman period of the 4th–5th centuries, when the synagogue was in use. Other coins include issues of Constantine I (308–337 CE), Valens (364–367 CE), and Theodosius I (388–392 CE). Later finds comprise coins of Justin I (518–527 CE), Heraclius (625–630 CE), and Constans II (641–647 CE), as well as four Islamic coins.

== Research history ==
Excavations were carried out at the site in December 1990, revealing the first fully preserved 4th-century Samaritan synagogue identified in the historical region of Samaria.

== See also ==
- Khirbet Samara
- Tzur Natan
- Samaritanism

== Bibliography ==
- Di Segni, Leah (1993). "The Greek Inscriptions in the Samaritan Synagogue at El Khirbe with Some Considerations on the Function of the Samaritan Synagogue in the Late Roman Period". In Alliata, Eugenio; Manns, Frédéric (eds.). Early Christianity in Context: Monuments and Documents. Studium Biblicum Franciscanum, Collectio Maior. Jerusalem: Franciscan Printing Press. pp. 231–239.
- Magen, Yitzhak (1993). "Samaritan Synagogues". In Alliata, Eugenio; Manns, Frédéric (eds.). Early Christianity in Context: Monuments and Documents. Studium Biblicum Franciscanum, Collectio Maior. Jerusalem: Franciscan Printing Press. pp. 193–230.
- Magen, Yitzhak (2010). "Mosaics from Samaritan synagogue". The Good Samaritan Museum. Judea and Samaria Publications. Vol. 12. Archaeological Staff Officer of Judea and Samaria. pp. 127–179. doi:10.2307/j.ctt1x76gr7.8. ISBN 978-965-406-219-0. JSTOR j.ctt1x76gr7.8.
- Pummer, Reinhard (1999). Fine, Steven (ed.). "Samaritan Synagogues and Jewish Synagogues: Similarities and Differences". Jews, Christians, and Polytheists in the Ancient Synagogue: Cultural Interaction During the Greco-Roman Period. London, New York: Routledge: 124. ISBN 978-0415518895.
