= Samaritan revolts =

5th/6th-century CE revolts by Samaritans against the Byzantine Empire

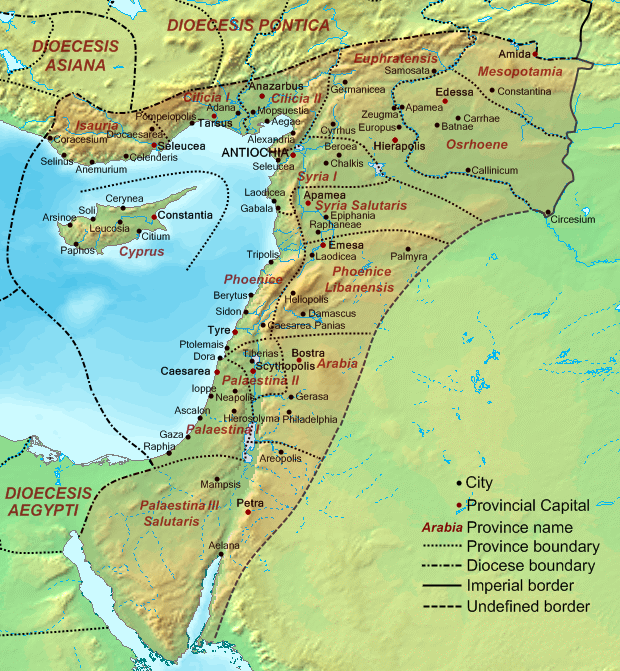
- Diocese of the Orient at the Byzantine period, where Samaritans largely inhabited Palaestina Prima (Samaria).
Date	484–573 (89 years)
Location	Palaestina Prima (Samaria), Diocese of the East, Byzantine Empire
Result	Byzantine victory
Territorial changes	Byzantine Empire restores control of Samaria; it remains a part of Palaestina Prima

Belligerents
Byzantine Empire: Dux Palaestinae troops; Arcadiani; Ghassanids	Samaritan rebels; Jewish rebels (556 and 572 revolts)

Commanders and leaders
Asclepiades and Rheges (484 revolt); Governor Procopius (495 revolt); Roman emperor Justinian I (ben Sabar revolt, 529–531); Stephanus and Amantius (556 and 572 revolts); Zacharias of Jerusalem (POW) (Jewish revolt)	Unknown leader (484 revolt): Justa (Justa revolt, 495); Julianus ben Sabar (executed) (ben Sabar revolt, 529–531); Samaritan and Jewish leadership (556 and 572 revolts): Nehemiah ben Hushiel (executed)

Casualties and losses
ben Sabar revolt: Unknown 556–572 revolt: Unknown Jewish revolt against Heraclius: 66,509 killed	ben Sabar revolt: 20,000–100,000 killed 556–572 revolt: 100,000–120,000 killed Jewish revolt against Heraclius 4,518 killed

The Samaritan revolts (c. 484–573) were a series of Samaritan insurrections in the province of Palaestina Prima against the Byzantine Empire. The revolts were marked by great violence on both sides, and brutal suppression at the hands of the Byzantines and their Ghassanid allies severely reduced the Samaritan population. The events irreversibly shifted the demographics of the region, making the Christians the dominant group in Palaestina Prima for many decades onward.

== Primary sources ==
The historical reconstruction of the Samaritan revolts relies on three primary types of evidence. Late Antique Christian writings serve as the main narrative source and, despite some lack of clarity, provide the framework for an overall reconstruction. While the events are also mentioned in medieval Samaritan chronicles, these are chronologically distant and described by scholar of religion Reinhard Pummer as "very sparse and ambiguous". Finally, archaeological evidence of site destruction confirms both the revolts and subsequent punitive acts, though the interpretation of these findings depends heavily on the context provided by the Christian accounts.

== Ante bellum ==
=== Samaria under early Roman rule ===
The Samaritans first came under Roman hegemony following the conquest of Hasmonean Judea in 63 BCE. For the following decades, Samaria, like the rest of the region, formed part of a client state ruled first by the Hasmoneans and, starting in 37 BCE, by Herod the Great. This situation continued until 6 CE, when Herod's son Archelaus, the ethnarch of Judea, Samaria, and Idumaea, was deposed by Augustus. His territories were subsequently annexed by Rome and organized as the province of Judaea. In 66 CE, the Jewish population of the province rose in arms in what would become known as the First Jewish Revolt. The hostilities also affected Samaria. According to Josephus, in July 67 CE, the Roman general Vespasian sent Cerialis, the commander of Legio V Macedonica, to confront a large group of Samaritans who had gathered on Mount Gerizim; 11,600 Samaritans were reportedly killed.

In 132 CE, the Jews of Judaea rose in yet another uprising against Rome, the Bar Kokhba revolt. While some rabbinic works depict the Samaritans as obstructing Jewish efforts, these accounts are generally viewed as legendary. Furthermore, later Samaritan chronicles referring to Hadrian's reign fail to mention the Bar Kokhba revolt, leading historian Menachem Mor to conclude there is no concrete evidence of Jewish–Samaritan cooperation. (Note: Samaritan accounts that refer to Hadrian's rule are relatively late; some praise him, others portray him as a persecutor who banned circumcision and Sabbath observance. Regardless, none of these sources mention the Bar Kokhba revolt.) Consequently, unlike nearby Jewish-dominated areas, the Samaritan heartland in central Samaria appears to have remained largely unaffected by the war.

=== Late Roman rule ===
The Bar Kokhba war left the Jewish heartland of Judea proper largely depopulated, and Jews were barred from Jerusalem and its environs. This demographic shift enabled the immigration of various groups, including the Samaritans, into the depopulated territorieswho expanded into northern Judea, the Beit She'an Valley, and the coastal plain. Concurrently, the districts of Lod and Emmaus transitioned into mixed settlement zones populated by Jews, Samaritans, and other groups. (Note: The Samaritan expansion is corroborated by the Jerusalem Talmud (Kiddushin 4, 65c; Yevamot 8, 9d), in which Rabbi Abbahu states that thirteen towns were settled by Samaritans following the revolt.)

Tensions in the province remained high and apparently erupted into small-scale hostilities in the late 2nd century. Christian scholars Eusebius and Orosius mention a "Jewish and Samaritan war" dated to 193/194 CE, the Year of the Five Emperors, during which the region saw a succession war between Pescennius Niger and the eventually victorious Septimius Severus. The Historia Augusta mentions that the city status of Neapolis was later withdrawn by Severus. Scholar Michael Avi-Yonah suggested that the Samaritans supported Niger while the Jews supported Severus, leading to hostilities between the two groups. Conversely, historian E. Mary Smallwood viewed the event as another minor episode of the anti-Roman nationalist activity that persisted in the province throughout this period.

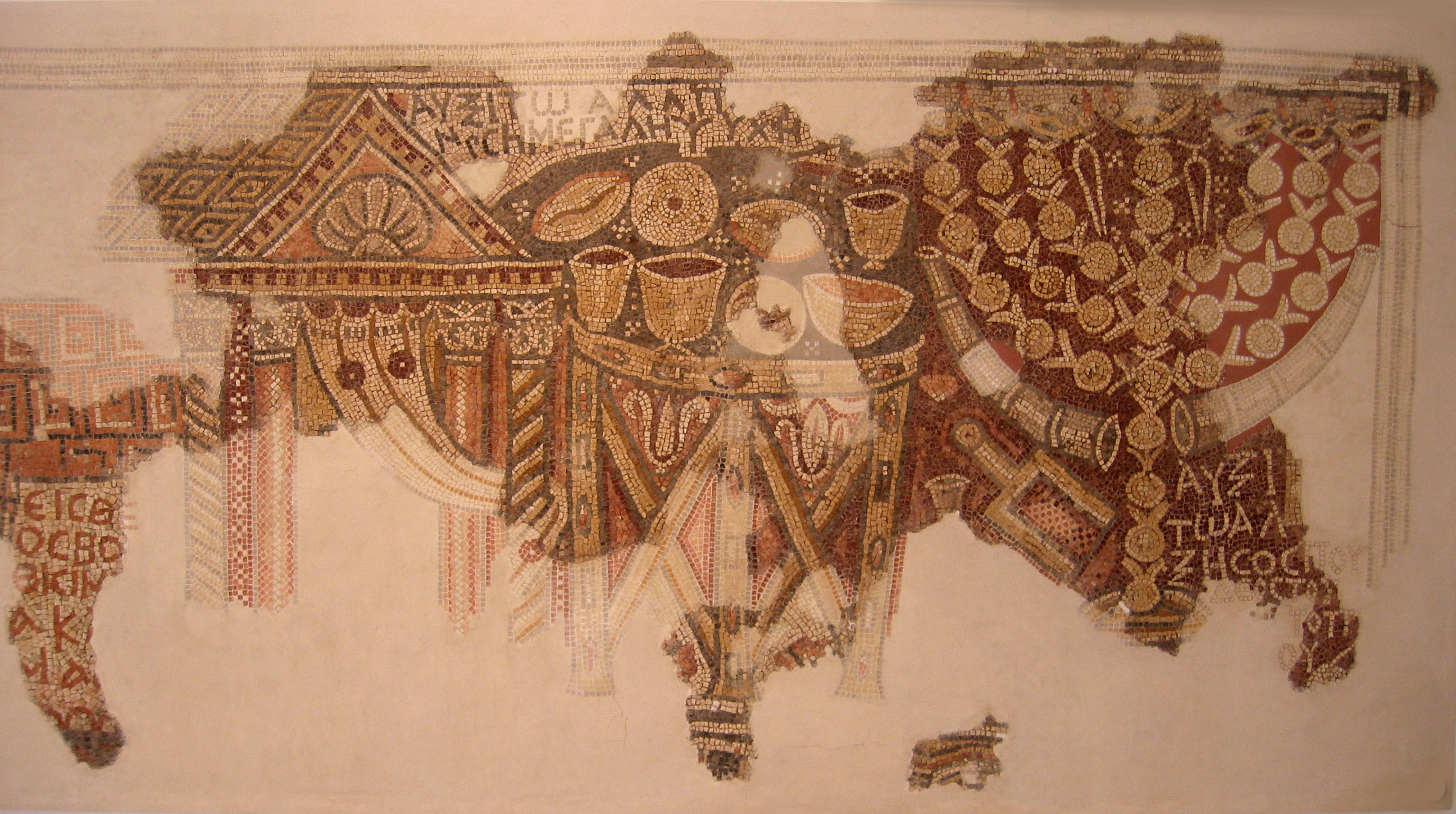
Mosaic floor of the 4th-century Samaritan synagogue at el-Khirbe, today at the Good Samaritan Museum

With the withdrawal of the Roman legion, Samaria enjoyed a limited kind of independence during the 3rd and 4th centuries. Baba Rabba (literally, "Baba the Great", ca. 288–362), the Samaritan leader, divided his territories into districts and established local rulers out of aristocratic Samaritan families. He also executed a series of reforms and installed state institutions. Much of the Samaritan liturgy was set by Baba Rabba during this time. This period of semi-independence was brief, however, as Byzantine forces overran Samaria and took Baba Rabba captive to Constantinople, where he died in prison several years later around 362.

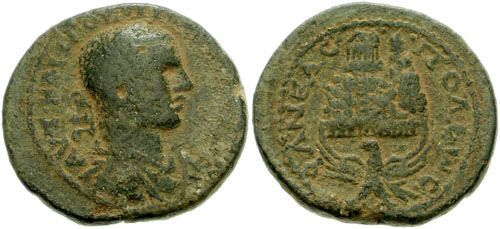
A coin with the inscription of Roman stairs of Neapolis to Mt. Gerizim

== Justa uprising ==
During the reign of Emperor Zeno (r. 474–475 and 476–491), tensions between the Christian community and the Samaritans in Colonia Flavia Neapolis (Shechem) grew dramatically. According to Samaritan sources, Zeno, whom the sources refer to as "Zait the King of Edom", persecuted the Samaritans mercilessly. The Emperor went to Neapolis, gathered the Samaritan elders, and asked them to convert to Christianity; when they refused, Zeno had many Samaritans killed and rebuilt their synagogue into a church. Zeno then took possession of Mount Gerizim and built several edifices, among them a tomb for his recently deceased son, on which he placed a Christian cross so the Samaritans would be forced to prostrate themselves in front of the tomb.

In 484, the Samaritans revolted, provoked by rumors that the Christians intended to transfer the remains of Aaron's sons and grandsons Eleazar, Ithamar, and Phinehas. They reacted by entering the cathedral of Neapolis, killing the Christians inside and severing the fingers of the bishop Terebinthus.

The Samaritans elected Justa or Justasas as their king and moved to Caesarea Maritima, where a noteworthy Samaritan community lived. There, many Christians were killed and the church of St. Procopius was destroyed. Justa celebrated the victory with games in the circus.

According to John Malalas, Asclepiades, the dux Palaestinae (commander of the province's Limes Arabicus troops), whose units were reinforced by the Caesarea-based Arcadiani of lestodioktes (police chief) Rheges, defeated Justa, killed him and sent his head to Zeno. Terebinthus meanwhile fled to Constantinople, requesting an army garrison to prevent further attacks. According to Procopius, Terebinthus went to Zeno to ask for revenge; the Emperor personally went to Samaria to quell the rebellion.

As a result of the revolt, Zeno erected a church dedicated to Mary, mother of Jesus on Mount Gerizim. He also forbade the Samaritans to travel to the mountain to celebrate their religious ceremonies, and confiscated their synagogue there. These actions by the emperor fueled Samaritan anger towards the Christians further.

Some modern historians believe that the order of the facts preserved by Samaritan sources should be inverted, as the persecution of Zeno was a consequence of the rebellion rather than its cause, and should have happened after 484, around 489. Zeno rebuilt the church of Saint Procopius in Neapolis and the Samaritans were banned from Mount Gerizim, on whose top a signaling tower was built to alert in case of civil unrest.

== 495 Samaritan unrest ==
Samaritans rebelled again in 495, during the reign of Emperor Anastasius I Dicorus, reoccupying Mount Gerizim. The Samaritan mob commanded by a Samaritan woman is said to have seized the Church of St. Mary and massacred the garrison. The revolt was subsequently suppressed by the Byzantine governor of Edessa, Procopius, and the Samaritan leaders were slain.

== Ben Sabar revolt (529–531) ==
Under a charismatic, messianic claimant named Julianus ben Sabar (or ben Sahir), the Samaritans launched a war, sometimes referred to as the final Samaritan revolt, to create an independent state in 529. This was perhaps the most violent of all the Samaritan uprisings. According to Procopius, the violence erupted due to restrictions imposed on Samaritans by the Byzantine authorities via Justinian's edicts, while Cyril of Scythopolis indicates sectarian tensions between Christians and Samaritans as the primary cause for the revolt.

Following massive riots in Scythopolis and the countryside, the rebels quickly conquered Neapolis, and ben Sabar emerged as their king. Ben Sabar followed a strict anti-Christian policy: Neapolis' bishop and many priests were murdered, and he persecuted the Christians, destroyed churches and organized guerrilla warfare in the countryside, driving the Christians away. According to Byzantine sources, the name of the bishop was Ammonas (also Sammon or Ammon). As a response, forces of the dux Palaestinae, combined with units of local governors and the Ghassanid phylarch Abu Karib ibn Jabalah, were dispatched to deal with the uprising. Ben Sabar was surrounded and defeated after withdrawing with his forces from Neapolis. After his capture, he was beheaded, and his head, crowned with a diadem, was sent to Emperor Justinian.

By 531 the rebellion had been put down. The forces of Emperor Justinian I quelled the revolt with the help of the Ghassanid Arabs under the leadership of Abu Karib; tens of thousands of Samaritans died or were enslaved, with their death-toll possibly being between 20,000 and 100,000. The Byzantine Empire thereafter virtually outlawed the Samaritan faith. According to Procopius of Caesarea, the majority of Samaritan peasants chose to be defiant in this revolt and "were cut to pieces". Further, Samaria, the "world's most fertile land, was left with no one to till it".

== 556 Samaritan revolt ==
The emperor Justinian I faced another major revolt in 556. On this occasion the Jews and the Samaritans seem to have made common cause, beginning their rebellion in Caesarea early in July. They fell upon the Christians in the city, killing many of them, after which they attacked and plundered the churches. The governor, Stephanus, and his military escort were pressed hard, and eventually the governor was killed, while taking refuge in his own house. Amantius, the governor of the East was ordered to quell the revolt, after the widow of Stephanus reached Constantinople.

Despite the Jewish participation, the rebellion seems to have gathered less support than the revolt of Ben Sabar. The Church of the Nativity was burned down, suggesting that the rebellion had spread south to Bethlehem. Either 100,000 or 120,000 are said to have been butchered following the revolt. Others were tortured or driven into exile. However, this is probably an exaggeration as punishment seems to have been limited to the district of Caesarea.

== 572 revolt ==
Still, the tensions were not over yet. Emperor Justin II (r. 565–578) complained about "outrages committed by....Samaritans at the foot of Mount Carmel upon the Christian Churches and the holy images". Probably in response to this event, Justin II issued an order in May 572 rescinding the restoration of rights granted by Justinian. In response, a second joint Samaritan-Jewish revolt took place in summer 572 and again in early 573 or alternatively in 578. John of Ephesus and John of Nikiû may have described this revolt.

== Archaeology ==
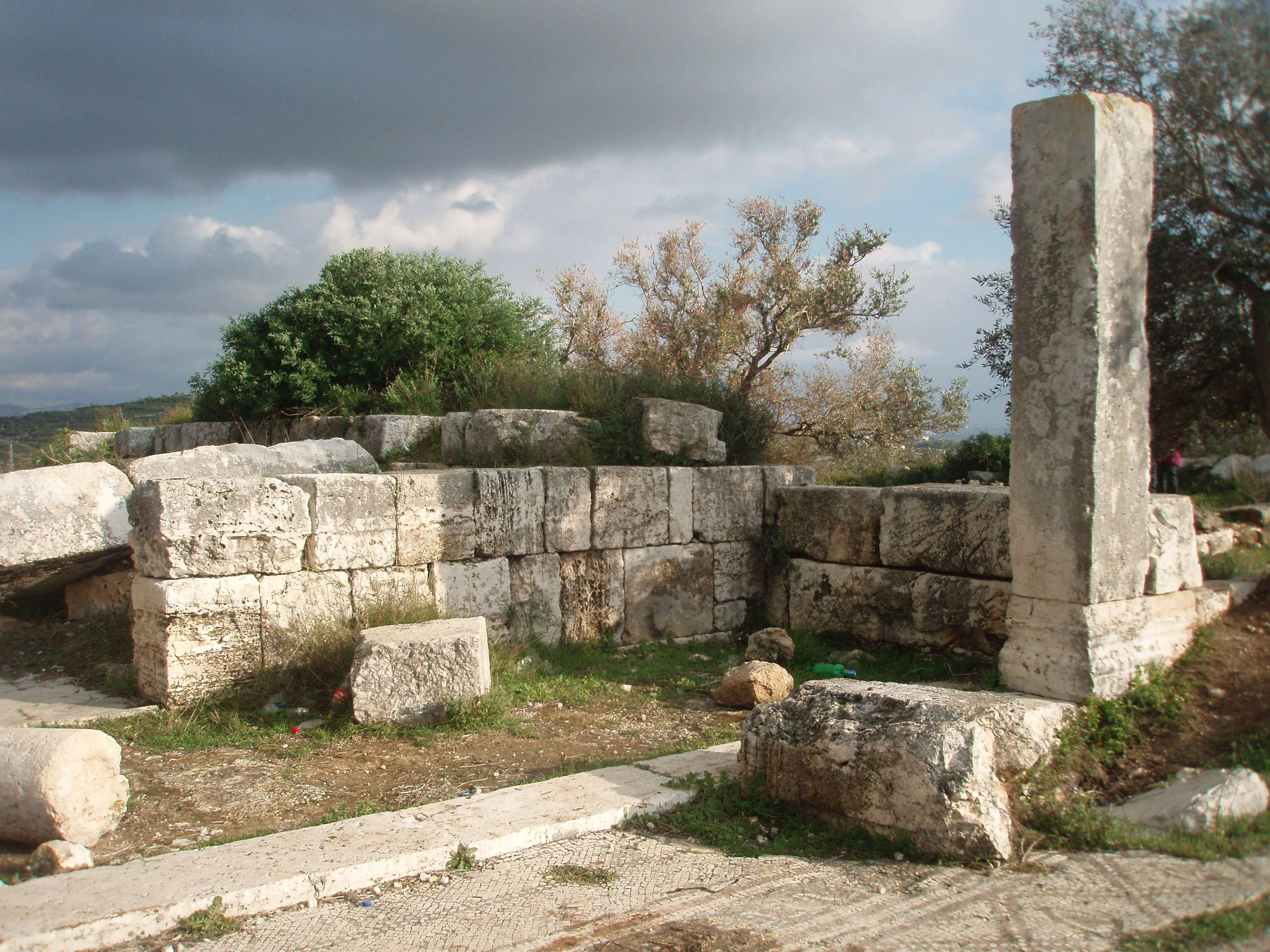
Ruins of the Khirbet Samara synagogue, destroyed in the 6th century and partially rebuilt at a later date

The Samaritan revolts are attested archaeologically through their impact on Samaritan synagogues, which has been associated with Justinian's decree that "Samaritan synagogues must be destroyed." One example is the 4th-century synagogue at el-Khirbe; it fell out of use in the 5th or 6th century—likely under Zeno or Justinian—before being restored in the 7th century. Another case is the synagogue at Khirbet Samara, which was destroyed in the 6th century, as evidenced by the remains of ash discovered in its apse. Later, the synagogue was partially rebuilt.

== Aftermath ==
The Samaritan revolts triggered a harsh Byzantine response marked by mass killings, torture, and forced conversions, which decimated five consecutive generations and shattered the community's ability to renew itself. Their religious center on Mount Gerizim was destroyed, their legal rights were stripped, and they were pushed to the margins of society. Claudine Dauphin characterizes this Byzantine campaign as an act of ethnic cleansing. By the eve of the Muslim conquest of the Levant in 636, the Samaritans had become a diminished and politically insignificant group.

Samaritan numbers remained very low in the Islamic era, similar to the late Byzantine period – a result of previous revolts and forced conversions. Contemporary sources claim 30-80,000 Samaritans were living in Caesarea Maritima prior to the Muslim invasion (alongside roughly 100,000 Jews), out of a total provincial population of 700,000 of mostly Christians. By the early Islamic period the Samaritan diaspora disappears from records except small communities of Egypt and Damascus. The Egyptian Samaritan community was likely swelled due to refugees from coastal cities of Palestine as a result of Muslim invasion.

Following the Muslim conquest, Samaritans suffered more social and economic discrimination than Christians and Jews, as Muslim rulers often doubted whether Samaritans were People of the Book. According to Nathan Schur, the conquest had initially benefited the community. Many Samaritans converted to Islam for economic, social, and theological reasons, and the community's numbers continued to dwindle.

Harsh persecution of Samaritans was at times carried out by the more fanatical caliphs, such as Al-Mansur (754–775), Harun al-Rashid (786–809) and al-Mutawakkil (847–861). Islamic religious leaders also periodically sought to consolidate their power by stirring up anti-Samaritan sentiments and occasionally calling for their annihilation. As a result, Samaritan wealth was practically wiped out.

== See also ==
Jewish and Samaritan revolts

- History of the Jews in the Roman Empire
- Jewish–Roman wars
  - First Jewish–Roman War, 66–73 CE
  - Kitos War, 115–117 CE
  - Diaspora revolt, 115–117 CE
  - Bar Kokhba revolt, 132–136 CE
- Jewish revolt against Constantius Gallus, 352 CE
- Jewish revolt against Heraclius, 614-617/625

Related topics

- Ghassanids
- List of conflicts in the Near East

== Bibliography ==
=== Sources ===
- Fine, Steven (2022). ""A Place in which to Read, to Interpret, and to Hear Petitions": Samaritan Synagogues". The Samaritans: A Biblical People. Brill. pp. 81–94. ISBN 978-90-04-46691-3.
- Klein, Eitan (2024). יהודה משממה תקום: מבט ארכאולוגי על ארץ יהודה בתקופה הרומית המאוחרת [From Barren Land Judea Shall Rise: An Archaeological Perspective of the Land of Judea during the Late Roman Period] (in Hebrew). Ariel University Press. ISBN 978-965-7632-45-1.
- Mor, Menahem (2016). The Second Jewish Revolt: The Bar Kokhba War, 132–136 CE. Brill. ISBN 978-90-04-31463-4.
- Pummer, Reinhard (1999). Fine, Steven (ed.). "Samaritan Synagogues and Jewish Synagogues: Similarities and Differences". Jews, Christians, and Polytheists in the Ancient Synagogue: Cultural Interaction During the Greco-Roman Period. London, New York: Routledge: 124. ISBN 978-0415518895.
- Pummer, Reinhard (2002). Early Christian Authors on Samaritans and Samaritanism: Texts, Selected Commentaries and Introductions. Texte und Studien zum antiken Judentum. Vol. 92. Tübingen: Mohr Siebeck. ISBN 978-3-16-147831-4.
- Raviv, Dvir; Ben David, Chaim (2021). "Cassius Dio's figures for the demographic consequences of the Bar Kokhba War: Exaggeration or reliable account?". Journal of Roman Archaeology. 34 (2): 585–607. doi:10.1017/S1047759421000271. ISSN 1047-7594.
- Rogers, Guy MacLean (2022). For the Freedom of Zion: The Great Revolt of Jews against Romans, 66–74 CE. Yale University Press. ISBN 978-0-300-24813-5. Archived from the original on 7 December 2024.
