= Julianus ben Sabar =

6th-century messianic Samaritan leader

Julianus ben Sabar (also known as Julian or Julianus ben Sahir and Latinized as Iulianus Sabari filius) was a leader of the Samaritans, seen widely as being the Taheb who led a failed revolt against the Byzantine Empire during the early 6th century.

In 529 Julianus led a revolt against the Byzantine Empire ruled by Justinian I, because of legislation outlawing the Samaritan religion, according to Procopius, though Cyril of Scythopolis claimed it was because of tension with Christians.

Julianus declared himself King of Israel, taking Jeroboam as his model, and led a Samaritan army to ravage the cities of Scythopolis, Caesarea Maritima, Neapolis, Bethlehem, and Emmaus. By 530 he had succeeded in capturing virtually all of Samaria. The revolt was marked by large scale slaughter of Christians and destruction of Christian churches.

Justinian enlisted the help of the Ghassanids, and by 531 the rebellion had been put down. Julianus himself was beheaded according to Theophanes the Confessor. Tens of thousands of Samaritans were killed and enslaved and many were sold as slaves throughout the Middle East. Others were sold as far away as the Sasanian Empire, where their descendants would be included in the invasion of the Levant during the Byzantine–Sassanid War of 602–628 some eighty-five years later and shortly before the Muslim conquest of the Levant.

Julianus' revolt has been compared to the Bar Kokhba revolt 400 years prior. Both revolts against foreign imperial occupation led by a Messiah/Taheb were initially successful, only to be later brutally suppressed. However, unlike the Jews, the Samaritan community never recovered from their ethnic cleansing, and were further reduced to a minority in Samaria after persecutions in the late Middle Ages by the Mamluk Sultanate under whose rule they became nearly extinct.
