= Kairouan Yeshiva =

Talmudic Academy

The Yeshiva of Kairouan (Hebrew: ישיבת קירואן; Arabic: يشيفا القيروان) was a Talmudic Academy in Kairouan during the era of the Geonim sages. It was one of the main centers of Jewish thought between the 8th and 11th centuries. and is known for producing the first books of commentaries, or exegesis, to the Talmud itself.

== History ==
The first Jews arrive in Tunisia in the 9th century BCE, together with the first Phoenicians from Tyre. However, after the foundation of the city in the 7th century, the second wave of Jewish immigration arrived in the city, said to be coming from Cirenaica and Egypt. With the settlement and growing prosperity of Jews in the city as the Aghlabids slowly declined while the Fatimid Caliphate grew in power and extended its influence in North Africa through the Zirid dynasty, a need grew for contact with other Jewish communities, apart from the other north African yeshivot in Fez, in Gabès, in Sijilmassa, and Tlemcen. The religious leaders of Kairouan kept correspondence with communities from Spain, Provence, the Ashkenaz to Babylonia, helped by its geographic location, including with leading Torah authorities such as Rav Sherira Gaon, Rav Hai Gaon, and Shmuel Hanaggid. This communication and the commentaries written by the local scholars helped the development of new centers of halakhic studies to develop in Europe.

Rabbi Yaakov ben Nissim led the Kairouan yeshiva at the end of the 10th century. During his tenure, Rabbi Chushiel arrived in Kairouan from Italy, and upon Rabbi Yaakov ben Nissim's death, in 1006, succeeded him. Upon the death of Rabbi Chushiel, Rabbenu Nissim ben Jacob, son of Rabbi Yaakov ben Nissim, assumed the leadership of the yeshiva, and mentored Rabbenu Chananel ben Chushiel. At the peak of the yeshiva's prestige, Egyptian communities in Cairo and Alexandria would turn to the scholars of Kairouan, even though they were subject to the authority of the academies in the Land of Israel. In the Kairouan yeshiva, both the Babylonian Talmud and the Jerusalem Talmud were considered of equal halakhic relevance, which can be seen in the works of Rabbi Chananel and Rabbi Nissim, known by their side-by-side comparison of the two Talmuds, often using the Yerushalmi to supplement the Bavli. During that same period, Rabbi Isaac Alfasi also studied in Kairouan, before moving to Fez, Morocco. Rabbenu Nissim died in 1062.

=== Decline ===
After the Banu Hilal invasion in 1057 and conquest of the Zirid dynasty, vassals of the Fatimids, the community's economic power began to decline. By the middle of the 11th century, the Kairouan yeshiva had lost its stature as a world center of Torah study and by 1160, after the invasion of the Almohads, there were no more mentions of Jews in the city, as non-Muslims were not allowed into the city until 1881, when Tunisia became a French protectorate.

== See also ==
- Chushiel ben Elchanan
- History of the Jews in Kairouan
