= Sefer ha-Qabbalah =

Book by Abraham ibn Daud around 1160–1161

Sefer ha-Qabbalah (Hebrew: ספר הקבלה, lit. 'The Book of Tradition') was written by Abraham ibn Daud around 1160–1161. It is a survey of Jewish and general history which creates a comprehensive Jewish history narrative.

The book is a response to Karaite attacks against the historical legitimacy of Rabbinic Judaism and contains, among other items, the controversial tale of the kidnapping by pirates of four great rabbinic scholars from Babylonian academies, whose subsequent ransoming by Jewish communities around the Mediterranean accounts for the transmission of scholarly legitimacy to the rabbis of Jewish centers in North Africa and Christian Spain.

Like the Iggeret of Rabbi Sherira Gaon before it, the Sefer ha-Qabbalah forms an important component of Jewish historiography. In terms of chronology, Sefer ha-Qabbalah continues where the Iggeret leaves off, adding invaluable historical anecdotes not found elsewhere. The Sefer ha-Qabbalah puts the compilation of the Mishnah by Judah HaNasi in year 500 of the Seleucid Era, corresponding to 189 CE.

At the time, the term qabbalah simply meant "tradition". It had not yet assumed the mythical and esoteric connotations for which it is now known.

== Story of the Four Captives ==
The story describes a Muslim pirate from Córdoba, Spain, identified as Ibn Rumahis, who captured a vessel that had departed from Bari in southern Italy.

Onboard were four rabbis believed to be on a mission on behalf of the Talmudic academies in Babylonia to raise funds for the dowries of impoverished brides. The rabbis were taken captive.

These rabbis were eventually ransomed by Jewish communities:

- Rabbi Shemariah ben Elhanan was redeemed in Alexandria, Egypt;
- Rabbi Chushiel was in "Africa", likely Tunisia, and became the leader of the Kairouan rabbis;
- Rabbi Moses ben Hanoch and his son Hanoch ben Moses were ransomed in Córdoba.
- A fourth captive and the location of his redemption was unspecified.

The story is considered a literary allegory or a historical romance, rather than factual history, designed to bolster the legitimacy of the dispersed rabbinical institutions of the Jewish diaspora, and creating a foundational myth for the transfer of rabbinic authority from Babylonia to North Africa and Spain. The story uses tropes and motifs from earlier talmudic literature such as the story of R. Moses resembling the tale of Hillel. The story states it takes place in the time of Sherira Gaon, but Abd al-Rahman III died in 961 CE, and this creates chronological difficulties. However, the named individuals were historical. This came to the attention of Adolf Neubauer on noticing a reference to Shemarya and his son in the Cairo Geniza. Solomon Schechter published a letter from Hushiel to Shemariah which implied that Hushiel willingly traveled to Qairawan, casting doubt on Ibn Daud's account of capture. In another example of literary exaggeration, Joseph ibn Abitur, after his banishment from Spain, did not lead a life as miserable as Ibn Daud portrayed. Despite this, some scholars hold that the story of the four captives has a core of historical truth.

== Bibliography ==
- Bages, Jaime (1972). Séfer ha-Kabbaláh (Libro de la Tradición). Valencia: Anubar Ediciones.
