= Religious antisemitism =

Hatred of Jews due to religious reasons

Religious antisemitism is the aversion to or discrimination against Jews as a whole based on Abrahmic doctrines of supersession, which expect or demand the disappearance of Judaism and the conversion of Jews to other faiths. This form of antisemitism has frequently served as the basis for false claims and religious antisemitic tropes against Judaism. Sometimes, it is called theological antisemitism.

Some scholars have argued that modern antisemitism is primarily based on nonreligious factors, John Higham is emblematic of this school of thought. However, this interpretation has been challenged. In 1966, Charles Glock and Rodney Stark first published public opinion polling data, which showed that most Americans based their stereotypes of Jews on religion. Since then, further opinion polling in America and Europe has supported this conclusion.

== Origins ==
Father Edward Flannery, in his 1965 book The Anguish of the Jew: Twenty-Three Centuries of Antisemitism, traces the first clear examples of specific anti-Jewish sentiment back to Alexandria in the third century BCE. Flannery writes that it was the Jews' refusal to accept Greek religious and social standards that marked them out. Hecataetus of Abdera, a Greek historian of the early third century BCE, wrote that Moses "in remembrance of the exile of his people, instituted for them a misanthropic and inhospitable way of life." Manetho, an Egyptian historian, wrote that the Jews were expelled Egyptian lepers who had been taught by Moses "not to adore the gods". The same themes appeared in the works of Chaeremon, Lysimachus, Poseidonius, Apollonius Molon, Apion and Tacitus. Agatharchides of Cnidus wrote about the "ridiculous practices" of the Jews and of the "absurdity of their Law", and how Ptolemy Lagus was able to invade Jerusalem in 320 BCE because its inhabitants were observing the Sabbath. David Nirenberg also charts this history in Antijudaism: The Western Tradition.

== Christian antisemitism ==
Christian religious antisemitism is often expressed as anti-Judaism (i.e., it is argued that the antipathy is to the practices of Judaism). As such, it is argued, antisemitism would cease if Jews stopped practicing or changed their public faith, especially by converting to Christianity. However, there have been times when converts were also discriminated against, as in the case of the liturgical exclusion of Jewish converts, which occurred during the late 15th and 16th centuries, when Christianized Marranos or Iberian Jews were accused of secretly practicing Judaism or Jewish customs.

=== New Testament and antisemitism ===
Frederick Schweitzer and Marvin Perry write that the authors of the gospel account sought to place responsibility for the Crucifixion of Jesus and his death on Jews rather than the Roman emperor or Pontius Pilate. As a result, Christians for centuries viewed Jews as "the Christ Killers". The destruction of the Second Temple was seen as a judgment from God to the Jews for that death, and Jews were seen as "a people condemned forever to suffer exile and degradation". According to historian Edward H. Flannery, the Gospel of John in particular contains many verses that refer to Jews in a pejorative manner.

In 1 Thessalonians 2:14–16, Paul states that the Churches in Judea had been persecuted by the Jews who killed Jesus and that such people displease God, oppose all men, and had prevented Paul from speaking to the gentile nations concerning the New Testament message. Described by Hyam Maccoby as "the most explicit outburst against Jews in Paul's Epistles", these verses have repeatedly been employed for antisemitic purposes. Maccoby views it as one of Paul's innovations responsible for creating Christian antisemitism, though he notes that some have argued these particular verses are later interpolations not written by Paul. Craig Blomberg claims that viewing them as antisemitic is a mistake, but "understandable in light of [Paul's] harsh words". In his view, Paul is not condemning all Jews forever, but merely those he believed had specifically persecuted the prophets, Jesus, or the 1st-century church. Blomberg sees Paul's words here as no different in kind than the harsh words the prophets of the Old Testament have for the Jews.

The Codex Sinaiticus contains two extra books in the New Testament—the Shepherd of Hermas and the Epistle of Barnabas. The latter emphasizes the claim that it was the Jews, not the Romans, who killed Jesus and is full of antisemitism. The Epistle of Barnabas was not accepted as part of the canon; Professor Bart Ehrman has stated, "the suffering of Jews in the subsequent centuries would, if possible, have been even worse had the Epistle of Barnabas remained".

=== Early Christianity ===
Many early and influential Church works—such as the dialogues of Justin Martyr, the homilies of John Chrysostom, and the testimonies of the church father Cyprian—are strongly anti-Jewish.

During a discussion on the celebration of Easter during the First Council of Nicaea in 325 CE, Roman emperor Constantine said,

... it appeared an unworthy thing that in the celebration of this most holy feast we should follow the practice of the Jews, who have impiously defiled their hands with enormous sin, and are, therefore, deservedly afflicted with blindness of soul. ... Let us then have nothing in common with the detestable Jewish crowd; for we have received from our Saviour a different way.

Prejudice against Jews in the Roman Empire was formalized in 438, when the Code of Theodosius II established Christianity as the only legal religion in the Roman Empire. The Justinian Code a century later stripped Jews of many of their rights, and Church councils throughout the 6th and 7th centuries, including the Council of Orleans, further enforced anti-Jewish provisions. These restrictions began as early as 305, when, in Elvira (now Granada), a Spanish town in Andalucia, the first known laws of any church council against Jews appeared. Christian women were forbidden to marry Jews unless the betrothed Jewish male first converted to Catholicism. Jews were forbidden to extend hospitality to Catholics. Jews could not keep Catholic Christian concubines and were forbidden to bless the fields of Catholics. In 589, in Catholic Iberia, the Third Council of Toledo ordered that children born of a marriage between Jews and Catholics be baptized by force. By the Twelfth Council of Toledo (681), a policy of forced conversion of all Jews was initiated (Liber Judicum, II.2 as given in Roth). Thousands fled, and others converted to Roman Catholicism.

==== Accusations of deicide ====
Although never a part of Christian dogma, many Christians, including members of the clergy, held the Jewish people under an antisemitic canard to be collectively responsible for deicide, the killing of Jesus, who they believed was the son of God. According to this interpretation, some Christian traditions historically attributed responsibility for Jesus’ death to the Jewish people present at the time, as well as collectively over generations, labeling it as the sin of deicide, or God-killing. This belief played a significant role in fueling antisemitic attitudes and actions in various Christian societies throughout history.

Passion plays are dramatic stagings representing the trial and death of Jesus, and they have historically been used in remembrance of Jesus' death during Lent. These plays historically blamed the Jews for the death of Jesus in a polemical fashion, depicting a crowd of Jewish people condemning Jesus to death by crucifixion and a Jewish leader assuming eternal collective guilt for the crowd for the murder of Jesus, which, The Boston Globe explains, "for centuries prompted vicious attacks—or pogroms—on Europe's Jewish communities".

==== Blood libel ====
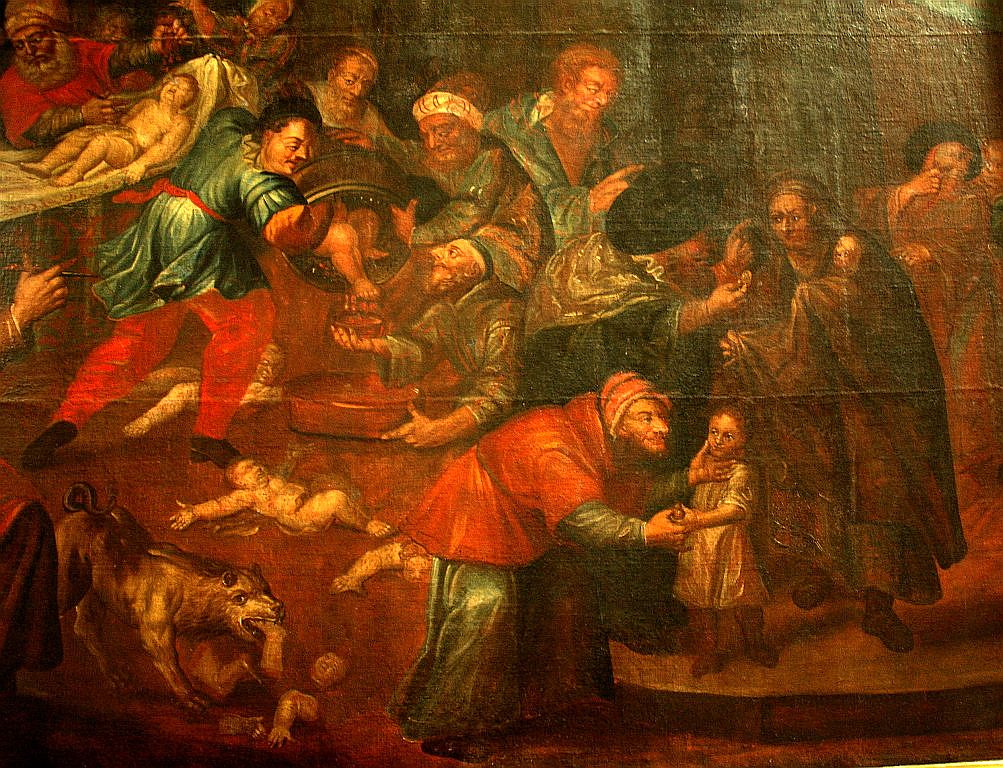
Painting in Sandomierz Cathedral, Poland, depicts Jews murdering Christian children for their blood, ~ 1750

Blood libels are false accusations that Jews use human blood in religious rituals. Historically, these are accusations that the blood of Christian children is especially coveted. In many cases, blood libels served as the basis for a blood libel cult, in which the alleged victim of human sacrifice was elevated to the status of a martyr and, in some cases, canonized.

Although the first known instance of a blood libel is found in the writings of Apion, who claimed that the Jews sacrificed Greek victims in the Temple, no further incidents are recorded until the 12th century when blood libels began to proliferate. These libels have persisted from then through the 21st century.

In the modern era, the blood libel continues to be a major aspect of antisemitism. It has extended its reach to accuse Jews of many different forms of harm that can be carried out against other people.

=== Medieval and Renaissance Europe ===
Antisemitism was widespread in Europe during the Middle Ages. In those times, the main cause of prejudice against Jews in Europe was the religious one. Although not part of Roman Catholic dogma, many Christians, including members of the clergy, held the Jewish people collectively responsible for the death of Jesus, a practice originated by Melito of Sardis.

Among socio-economic factors were restrictions by the authorities. Local rulers and church officials closed the doors for many professions to the Jews, pushing them into occupations considered socially inferior such as accounting, rent-collecting, and moneylending, which was tolerated then as a "necessary evil". During the Black Death, Jews were accused of being the cause and were often killed. There were expulsions of Jews from England, France, Germany, Portugal and Spain during the Middle Ages as a result of antisemitism.

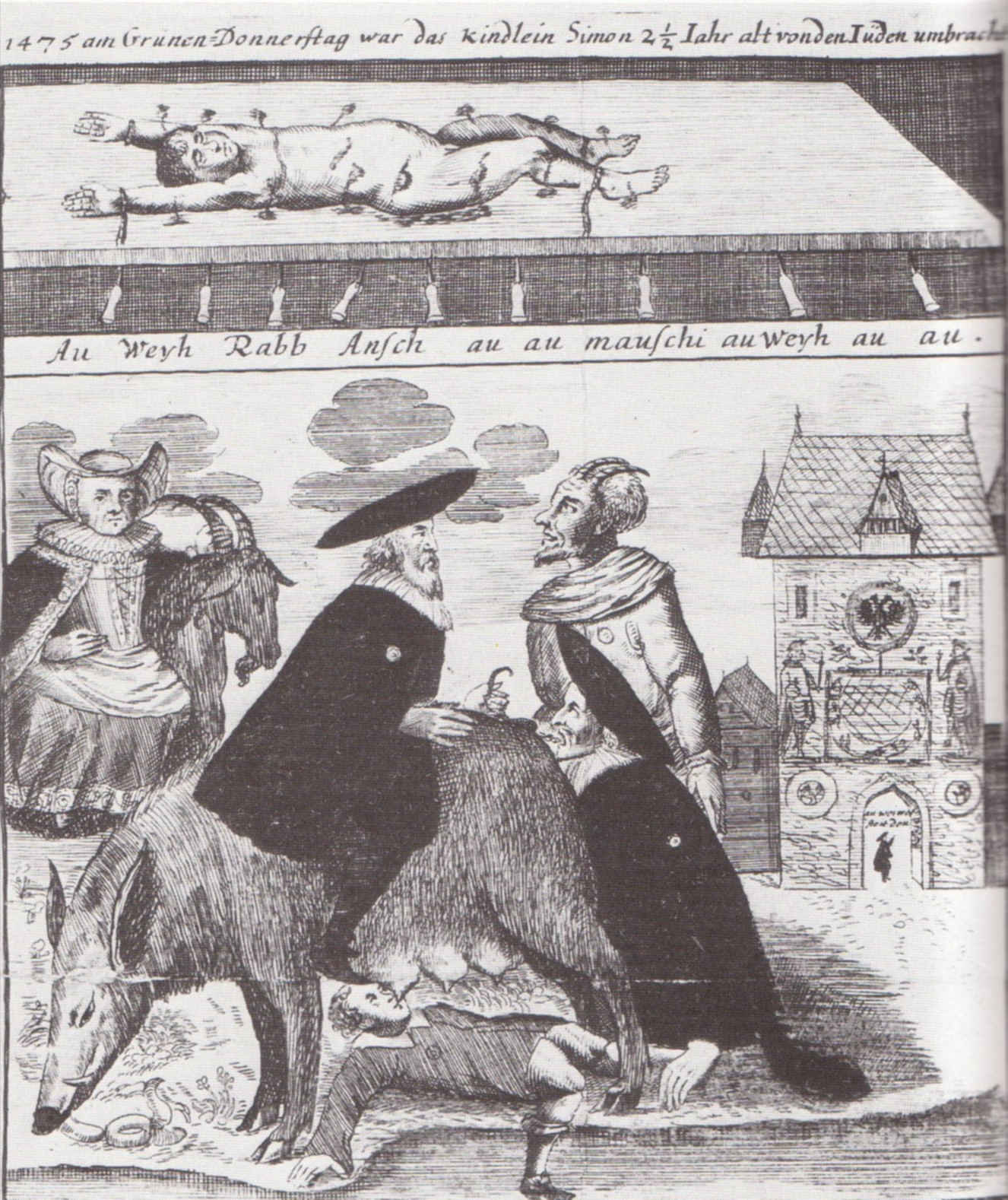
18th century Frankfurt Judensau

German for "Jews' sow", Judensau was the derogatory and dehumanizing imagery of Jews that appeared around the 13th century. Its popularity lasted for over 600 years and was revived by the Nazis. The Jews, typically portrayed in obscene contact with unclean animals such as pigs or owls or representing a devil, appeared on cathedral or church ceilings, pillars, utensils, etchings, etc. Often, the images combined several antisemitic motifs and included derisive prose or poetry.

"Dozens of Judensaus... intersect with the portrayal of the Jew as a Christ killer. Various illustrations of the murder of Simon of Trent blended images of Judensau, the devil, the murder of little Simon himself, and the Crucifixion. In the 17th-century engraving from Frankfurt... a well-dressed, very contemporary-looking Jew has mounted the sow backward and holds her tail, while a second Jew sucks at her milk and a third eats her feces. The horned devil, himself wearing a Jewish badge, looks on and the butchered Simon, splayed as if on a cross, appears on a panel above."

In Shakespeare's Merchant of Venice, considered to be one of the greatest romantic comedies of all time, the villain Shylock was a Jewish moneylender. By the end of the play, he is mocked on the streets after his daughter elopes with a Christian. Shylock, then, compulsorily converts to Christianity as a part of a deal gone wrong. This has raised profound implications regarding Shakespeare and antisemitism.

During the Middle Ages, the story of Jephonias, the Jew who tried to overturn Mary's funeral bier, changed from his converting to Christianity into his simply having his hands cut off by an angel.

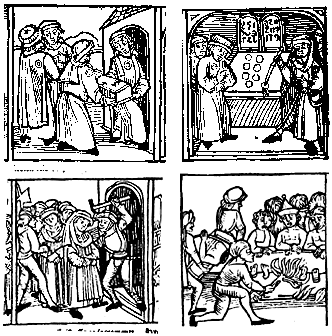
A 15th-century German woodcut showing an alleged host desecration. 1: the hosts are stolen 2: the hosts bleed when pierced by a Jew 3: the Jews are arrested 4: they are burned alive.

On many occasions, Jews were subjected to blood libels, false accusations of drinking the blood of Christian children in mockery of the Christian Eucharist. Jews were subject to a wide range of legal restrictions throughout the Middle Ages, some of which lasted until the end of the 19th century. Jews were excluded from many trades, the occupations of which varied with place and time and were determined by the influence of various non-Jewish competing interests. Often, Jews were barred from all occupations except money-lending and peddling, with even these at times forbidden.

=== 19th century ===
Branford Clarke illustration of the KKK against both Jews and Catholics in Heroes of the Fiery Cross by Bishop Alma White 1928 Published by the Pillar of Fire Church in Zarephath, New Jersey

Throughout the 19th century and into the 20th century, the Roman Catholic Church still incorporated strong antisemitic elements, despite increasing attempts to separate anti-Judaism, the opposition to the Jewish religion on religious grounds, and racial antisemitism. Pope Pius VII (1800–1823) had the walls of the Jewish Ghetto in Rome rebuilt after the Jews were released by Napoleon, and Jews were restricted to the Ghetto through the end of the Papal States in 1870.

Additionally, official organizations such as the Jesuits banned candidates "who are descended from the Jewish race unless it is clear that their father, grandfather, and great-grandfather have belonged to the Catholic Church" until 1946. Brown University historian David Kertzer, working from the Vatican archive, has further argued in his book The Popes Against the Jews that in the 19th century and early 20th century, the Church adhered to a distinction between "good antisemitism" and "bad antisemitism".

The "bad" kind promoted hatred of Jews because of their descent. This was considered un-Christian because the Christian message was intended for all of humanity regardless of ethnicity; anyone could become a Christian. The "good" kind criticized alleged Jewish conspiracies to control newspapers, banks, and other institutions, to care only about the accumulation of wealth, etc. Many Catholic bishops wrote articles criticizing Jews on such grounds and, when accused of promoting hatred of Jews, would remind people that they condemned the "bad" kind of antisemitism. Kertzer's work is not, therefore, without critics; the scholar of Jewish-Christian relations Rabbi David G. Dalin, for example, criticized Kertzer in the Weekly Standard for using evidence selectively.

=== The Holocaust ===
The Nazis used Martin Luther's book, On the Jews and Their Lies (1543), to claim a moral righteousness for their ideology. Luther seems to advocate the murder of those Jews who refused to convert to Christianity, writing that "we are at fault in not slaying them"

Archbishop Robert Runcie has asserted that: "Without centuries of Christian antisemitism, Hitler's passionate hatred would never have been so fervently echoed...because for centuries Christians have held Jews collectively responsible for the death of Jesus. On Good Friday Jews, have in times past, cowered behind locked doors with fear of a Christian mob seeking 'revenge' for deicide. Without the poisoning of Christian minds through the centuries, the Holocaust is unthinkable." The dissident Catholic priest Hans Küng has written in his book On Being a Christian that "Nazi anti-Judaism was the work of godless, anti-Christian criminals. But it would not have been possible without the almost two thousand years' pre-history of 'Christian' anti-Judaism..."

The document Dabru Emet was issued by many American Jewish scholars in 2000 as a statement about Jewish-Christian relations. This document states,

Nazism was not a Christian phenomenon. Without the long history of Christian anti-Judaism and Christian violence against Jews, Nazi ideology could not have taken hold nor could it have been carried out. Too many Christians participated in, or were sympathetic to, Nazi atrocities against Jews. Other Christians did not protest sufficiently against these atrocities. But Nazism itself was not an inevitable outcome of Christianity.

According to American historian Lucy Dawidowicz, antisemitism has a long history within Christianity. The line of "antisemitic descent" from Luther, the author of On the Jews and Their Lies, to Hitler is "easy to draw". In her The War Against the Jews, 1933-1945, she contends that Luther and Hitler were obsessed with the "demonologized universe" inhabited by Jews. Dawidowicz writes that the similarities between Luther's anti-Jewish writings and modern antisemitism are no coincidence because they derived from a common history of Judenhass, which can be traced to Haman's advice to Ahasuerus. Although modern German antisemitism also has its roots in German nationalism and the liberal revolution of 1848, Christian antisemitism, she writes, is a foundation that was laid by the Roman Catholic Church and "upon which Luther built". Dawidowicz's allegations and positions are criticized and not accepted by most historians, however. For example, in Studying the Jew Alan Steinweis notes that, "Old-fashioned antisemitism, Hitler argued, was insufficient, and would lead only to pogroms, which contribute little to a permanent solution. This is why, Hitler maintained, it was important to promote 'an antisemitism of reason,' one that acknowledged the racial basis of Jewry." Interviews with Nazis by other historians show that the Nazis thought that their views were rooted in biology, not historical prejudices. For example, "S. became a missionary for this biomedical vision... As for anti-Semitic attitudes and actions, he insisted that 'the racial question... [and] resentment of the Jewish race... had nothing to do with medieval anti-Semitism...' That is, it was all a matter of scientific biology and of community."

=== Post-Holocaust ===
The Second Vatican Council, the Nostra aetate document, and the efforts of Pope John Paul II helped reconcile Jews and Catholicism in recent decades, however. According to Catholic Holocaust scholar Michael Phayer, the Church as a whole recognized its failings during the council, when it corrected the traditional beliefs of the Jews having committed deicide and affirmed that they remained God's chosen people.

In 1994, the Church Council of the Evangelical Lutheran Church in America, the largest Lutheran denomination in the United States and a member of the Lutheran World Federation publicly rejected Luther's antisemitic writings.

== Islamic antisemitism ==
With the origin of Islam in the 7th century AD and its rapid spread through the Arabian Peninsula and beyond, Jews (and many other peoples) became subject to the will of Muslim rulers. The quality of the rule varied considerably in different periods, as did the attitudes of the rulers, government officials, clergy and general population to various subject peoples from time to time, which was reflected in their treatment of these subjects.

Various definitions of antisemitism in the context of Islam are given. The extent of antisemitism among Muslims varies depending on the chosen definition:

- Scholars like Claude Cahen and Shelomo Dov Goitein define it to be the animosity specifically applied to Jews only and do not include discriminations practiced against Non-Muslims in general. For these scholars, antisemitism in Medieval Islam has been local and sporadic rather than general and endemic [Shelomo Dov Goitein], not at all present [Claude Cahen], or rarely present.
- According to Bernard Lewis, antisemitism is marked by two distinct features: Jews are judged according to a standard different from that applied to others, and they are accused of "cosmic evil". For Lewis, from the late 19th century, movements appear among Muslims of which for the first time one can legitimately use the technical term antisemitic. However, he describes demonizing beliefs, anti-Jewish discrimination and systematic humiliations, as an "inherent" part of the traditional Muslim world, even if violent persecutions were relatively rare.

=== Jews in Islamic texts ===
Leon Poliakov, Walter Laqueur, and Jane Gerber, suggest that later passages in the Quran contain very sharp attacks on Jews for their refusal to recognize Muhammad as a prophet of God. While the Quran recognises a certain ethic kinship and cultural affinities between Jews and Muslims and shows some respect and tolerance for Jews (e.g. see Quran 2:47, 2:62), the Quran is laced with anti-Jewish pronouncements. Jews are called "corrupters of Scripture", are accused of falsehood and condemned by Allah for distortion of the Truth (4:46. Another topic is that of Jewish hostility towards Muslims, which is also reflected in the eight century hadith "A Jew will not be found alone with a Muslim without plotting to kill him". According to Poliakov, the Quran differentiates between "good and bad" Jews. Laqueur argues that the conflicting statements about Jews in the Muslim holy text have defined Arab and Muslim attitudes towards Jews to this day, especially during periods of rising Islamic fundamentalism.

In the light of the Jewish defeat at the hands of Muhammad, Muslims traditionally viewed Jews with contempt and as objects of ridicule. Jews were seen as hostile, cunning, and vindictive, but nevertheless weak and ineffectual. Cowardice was the quality most frequently attributed to Jews. Another stereotype associated with the Jews was their alleged propensity to trickery and deceit. While most anti-Jewish polemicists saw those qualities as inherently Jewish, Ibn Khaldun attributed them to the mistreatment of Jews at the hands of the dominant nations. For that reason, says Ibn Khaldun, Jews "are renowned, in every age and climate, for their wickedness and their slyness".

Some Muslim writers inserted racial overtones in their anti-Jewish polemics. Al-Jahiz speaks of the deterioration of the Jewish stock due to excessive inbreeding. Ibn Hazm also implies racial qualities in his attacks on the Jews. However, these were exceptions, and the racial theme left little or no trace in the medieval Muslim anti-Jewish writings. In general, as Muslims considered Jews unimportant and rather focused their attention on criticising Christianity, there are few polemical or works refuting Christianity.

=== Early Islam ===
According to Jane Gerber, "the Muslim is continually influenced by the theological threads of anti-Semitism embedded in the earliest chapters of Islamic history." Muhammad's attitude towards Jews was basically neutral at the beginning. During his lifetime, Jews lived on the Arabian Peninsula, especially in and around Medina. It appears that Mohammed was surprised by Jewish rejection of his claim of Prophetic finality and perfection. Eventually he fought them, defeated them, and most of them were killed. The traditional biographies of Muhammad describe the expulsion of the Banu Qaynuqa in the post Badrperiod, after a marketplace quarrel broke out between the Muslims and the Jews in Medina and Muhammad's negotiations with the tribe failed.

Following his defeat in the Battle of Uhud, Muhammad said he received a divine revelation that the Jewish tribe of the Banu Nadir wanted to assassinate him. Muhammad besieged the Banu Nadir and expelled them from Medina. Muhammad also attacked the Jews of the Khaybar oasis near Medina and defeated them, after they had supposedly betrayed the Muslims in a time of war, and he only allowed them to stay in the oasis on the condition that they deliver one-half of their annual produce to Muslims. This became the classical Islamic theory regarding Jews and other so-called People of the Book (including Christians), in which the price for toleration was the dual notion of tribute bearing and humiliation.

=== Medieval period ===
In the emerging empire of Islam after the Muslim conquests, the distinctive and inferior status of the Jews was shared with other groups. Jews who lived in Muslim lands, known as dhimmis (along with Christians), were allowed to practice their religion, and they were also allowed to administer their internal affairs, but they were subjected to certain conditions. Dhimmis had an inferior status under Islamic rule. They had several social and legal disabilities such as prohibitions against bearing arms or giving testimony in courts in cases involving Muslims. They had to pay the jizya (a per capita tax imposed on free adult non-Muslim males) to Muslims. Various humiliation measures were in force, from humiliating status symbols such as riding a donkey to wearing distinctive clothing, not found in the Quran or the hadith but invented in early medieval Baghdad. While in general dress regulations were infrequently implemented and often appeared rather in edges of the Muslim world such as Iran or Morocco, they became more widespread throughout the centuries. These clothing included in the early Middle Ages the zunnar, stipulated by the Pact of Umar, and the wearing of the yellow badge, which later influenced Christian Europe and which became in the late medieval Islamic world (also known as ruq'a in the Middle East or shikla in the Maghreb) the norm for all non-Muslims.

While according to Bernard Lewis Islamic law in theory does not differentiate between Jews and Christians in their status as dhimmis, Jane Gerber counters that of all dhimmis, Jews had the lowest status. Gerber maintains that this situation was especially pronounced in the latter centuries, when Christian communities enjoyed protection, unavailable to the Jews, under the provisions of Capitulations of the Ottoman Empire. For example, in 18th century Damascus, a Muslim noble held a festival, inviting to it all social classes in descending order, according to their social status: the Jews outranked only the peasants and prostitutes. In 1865, when the equality of all subjects of the Ottoman Empire was proclaimed, Ahmed Cevdet Pasha, a high-ranking official observed: "whereas in former times, in the Ottoman State, the communities were ranked, with the Muslims first, then the Greeks, then the Armenians, then the Jews, now all of them were put on the same level. Some Greeks objected to this, saying: 'The government has put us together with the Jews. We were content with the supremacy of Islam.'"

For most of the time, Jews rarely faced martyrdom or exile, or forced compulsion to change their religion, and they were mostly free in their choice of residence and profession. However, anti-Jewish sentiments in certain historical contexts often intensified during periods of Muslim political or military weakness or when Muslims perceived that certain Jewish individuals or communities had acted outside the social norms and restrictions established by Islamic law. In Moorish Iberia, ibn Hazm and Abu Ishaq focused their anti-Jewish writings on the latter allegation. This was also the chief motivating factor behind the 1033 Fez massacre, in which 6,000 Jews were killed, and the 1066 Granada massacre, when a Muslim mob stormed the royal palace in Granada, crucified Jewish vizier Joseph ibn Naghrela and massacred most of the Jewish population of the city. "More than 1,500 Jewish families, numbering 4,000 persons, fell in one day." There were further massacres in Fez in 1276 and 1465. In parallel with the accusation of Host desecration in Europe, in instances, Jews were occasionally accused of mocking Islamic rituals, such as when anti-Jewish disturbances broke out in 1438 in Fez after the rumour that Jews had poured wine into the lamp reservoirs of a mosque.

There was also the killing or forcible conversion of them by the rulers of the Almohad dynasty in Al-Andalus in the 12th century. Notable examples of the cases where the choice of residence was taken away from them includes confining Jews to walled quarters (mellahs) in Morocco beginning from the 15th century and especially since the early 19th century. Some Jews also converted to Islam, either voluntary, due to the pressure of the burden of the jizya tax or for other reasons. However, there were also some forced conversions in the 12th century under the Almohaddynasty of North Africa and al-Andalus as well as in Persia.

Some scholars have questioned the correctness of the term "antisemitism" to Muslim culture in pre-modern times. Robert Chazan and Alan Davies argue that the most obvious difference between pre-modern Islam and pre-modern Christendom was the "rich melange of racial, ethic, and religious communities" in Islamic countries, within which "the Jews were by no means obvious as lone dissenters, as they had been earlier in the world of polytheism or subsequently in most of medieval Christendom." According to Chazan and Davies, this lack of uniqueness ameliorated the circumstances of Jews in the medieval world of Islam. According to Norman Stillman, antisemitism, understood as hatred of Jews as Jews, "did exist in the medieval Arab world even in the period of greatest tolerance". Also see Bostom, Bat Ye'or, and the CSPI issued text, supporting Stillman and cited in the bibliography.

=== Nineteenth century ===
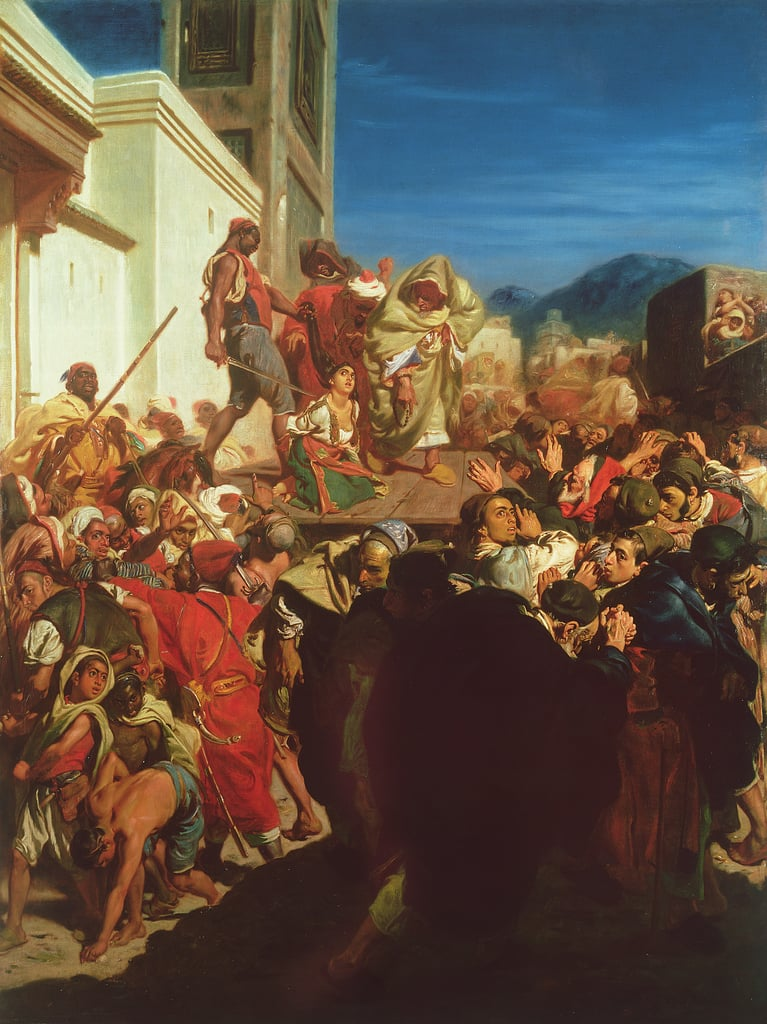
Execution of a Moroccan Jewess (c. 1861) by Alfred Dehodencq, who was inspired by the execution of Sol Hachuel who was accused of apostasy from Islam

Historian Martin Gilbert wrote that in the 19th century the position of Jews worsened in Muslim countries. There was a massacre of Jews in Baghdad in 1828 and in 1839, in the eastern Persian city of Mashhad, a mob burst into the Jewish Quarter, burned the synagogue, and destroyed the Torah scrolls. It was only by forcible conversion that a massacre was averted. There was another massacre in Barfurush in 1867.

In 1840, the Jews of Damascus were falsely accused of having murdered a Christian monk and his Muslim servant and of having used their blood to bake Passover bread or Matza. A Jewish barber was tortured until he "confessed"; two other Jews who were arrested died under torture, while a third converted to Islam to save his life. Throughout the 1860s, the Jews of Libya were subjected to what Gilbert calls punitive taxation. In 1864, around 500 Jews were killed in Marrakesh and Fez in Morocco. In 1869, 18 Jews were killed in Tunis, and an Arab mob looted Jewish homes and stores, and burned synagogues, on Jerba Island. In 1875, 20 Jews were killed by a mob in Demnat, Morocco; elsewhere in Morocco, Jews were attacked and killed in the streets in broad daylight. In 1891, the leading Muslims in Jerusalem asked the Ottoman authorities in Constantinople to prohibit the entry of Jews arriving en masse from Russia. In 1897, synagogues were ransacked and Jews were murdered in Tripolitania.

Benny Morris writes that one symbol of Jewish degradation was the phenomenon of stone-throwing at Jews by Muslim children. Morris quotes a 19th-century traveler: "I have seen a little fellow of six years old, with a troop of fat toddlers of only three and four, teaching [them] to throw stones at a Jew, and one little urchin would, with the greatest coolness, waddle up to the man and literally spit upon his Jewish gaberdine. To all this the Jew is obliged to submit; it would be more than his life was worth to offer to strike a Mahommedan."

According to Mark R. Cohen in The Oxford Handbook of Jewish Studies, most scholars conclude that Arab antisemitism in the modern world arose in the 19th century, against the backdrop of conflicting Jewish and Arab nationalism, and was imported into the Arab world primarily by nationalistically minded Christian Arabs (and only subsequently was it "Islamized").

=== Modern Islamic antisemitism ===
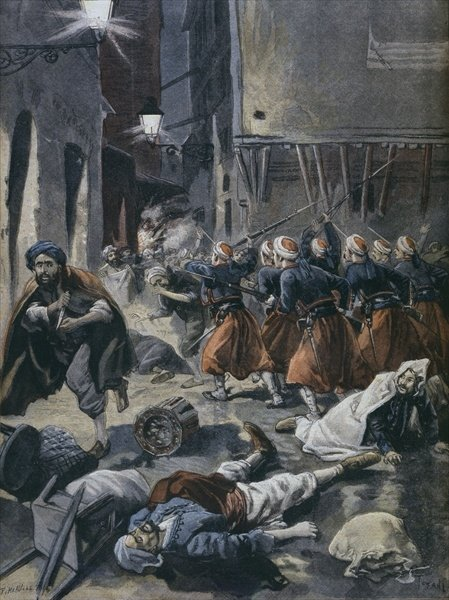
In the 1898 Algerian riots anti-Jewish pogroms took place in various parts of Algeria

The massacres of Jews in Muslim countries continued into the 20th century. Martin Gilbert writes that 40 Jews were murdered in Taza, Morocco, in 1903. In Yemen in 1905, old laws were revived, they forbade Jews from raising their voices in front of Muslims, they forbade Jews from building their houses higher than the houses of Muslims, and they forbade Jews from engaging in any traditional Muslim trade or occupation. The Jewish quarter in Fez was almost destroyed by a Muslim mob in 1912.

Antagonism and violence intensified as resentment against Zionist efforts in the British Mandate of Palestine spread. The Grand Mufti of Jerusalem, Mohammad Amin al-Husayni, played a key role in stoking violent opposition to Zionism and he closely allied himself with the Nazi regime. From 1941 al-Husayni was based in Germany from where he urged attacks on Jews. There were Nazi-inspired pogroms in Algeria in the 1930s, and massive attacks on the Jews in Iraq and Libya in the 1940s (see Farhud). Pro-Nazi Muslims slaughtered dozens of Jews in Baghdad in 1941.

Holocaust denial and Holocaust minimization efforts have found increasingly overt acceptance as sanctioned historical discourse in a number of Middle Eastern countries. Arabic and Turkish editions of Hitler's Mein Kampf and The Protocols of the Elders of Zion have found an audience in the region with limited critical response by local intellectuals and media.

According to Robert Satloff, both as rescuers and perpetrators, Muslims and Arabs were involved in the Holocaust during the pro-Nazi rule of Vichy in French North Africa, as well as during the Italian and German Nazi occupations of Tunisia and Libya.

The slogan and emblem of the Houthis (the Sarkha) translated as, "God is the Greatest, Death to America, Death to Israel, Curse be upon the Jews, Victory to Islam".

According to a Pew Global Attitudes Project report released on August 14, 2005, anti-Jewish sentiment was endemic. Of six Muslim majority countries surveyed, all have high percentages of their populations with unfavorable views of Jews. Turkey reported that 60% had unfavorable views of Jews, Pakistan reported 74%, Indonesia reported 76%, and Morocco reported 88%. 99% of Lebanese Muslims viewed Jews unfavorably, as did 99% of the Jordanian people.

George Gruen attributes the increased animosity towards Jews in the Arab world to several factors, including the breakdown of the Ottoman Empire and traditional Islamic society; domination by Western colonial powers under which Jews gained a larger role in the commercial, professional, and administrative life of the region; the rise of Arab nationalism, whose proponents sought the wealth and positions of local Jews through government channels; resentment against Jewish nationalism and the Zionist movement; and the readiness of unpopular regimes to scapegoat local Jews for political purposes.

=== Differences with Christianity ===
Bernard Lewis holds that Muslims were not antisemitic in the way Christians were for the most part because:

1. The Gospels are not part of the educational system in Muslim societies and therefore, Muslims are not brought up with the stories of Jewish deicide; on the contrary, the notion of deicide is rejected by the Quran as a blasphemous absurdity.
2. Muhammad and his early followers were not Jews and therefore, they did not present themselves as the true Israel or feel threatened by the survival of the old Israel.
3. The Quran was not viewed by Muslims as a fulfillment of the Hebrew Bible, but rather as a restorer of its original messages that had been distorted over time. Thus no clash of interpretations between Judaism and Islam could arise.
4. Muhammad was not killed by the Jewish community and he was ultimately victorious in his clash with the Jewish community in Medina.
5. Muhammad did not claim to be either the Son of God or the Messiah. Instead, he claimed that he was only a prophet; a claim which Jews repudiated less.
6. Muslims saw the conflict between Muhammad and the Jews as something of minor importance in Muhammad's career.

== See also ==
- Anti-Judaism
- Eliminationist antisemitism
- Expulsions and exoduses of Jews
- History of antisemitism
- Nation of Islam and antisemitism
- New antisemitism
