= Ibn Rumahis =

Muhammad ibn Rumahis (Arabic: محمد بن رماحس) was a Muslim Admiral in 10th Century Spain. He is remembered in Jewish History for capturing of four Babylonian Rabbis and ransoming them to the Jewish communities of Alexandria, Kairouan, Córdoba, and one unidentified other location.

== Personal life ==
He was born somewhere in the north of the Iberian Peninsula, where he was taken captive in a raid by the caliph Abd al-Rahman III (891-961). When the Caliph became acquainted with his seafaring abilities, he was manumitted and named Admiral of the Caliphate fleet, participating in various actions from 940 until his death in 360 AH (971 CE).

== Four Captive Rabbis ==
According to Abraham ibn Daud's Sefer HaQabbala, Ibn Rumahis captured a boat containing Shemariah ben Elhanan, Chushiel, father of Chananel ben Chushiel; Moses ben Hanoch; and one other anonymous rabbi while the four were traveling to raise money for the Talmudic academies in Babylonia. Knowing the emphasis Jews placed on redeeming captives, ibn Rumahis traveled the Mediterranean, selling Shemariah to the Alexandrian Jews, Chushiel to the Jews of Kairouan, and Moshe to the Spanish Jews. This is attributed as the source of the spread of Jewish learning from Babylonia to Spain and North Africa. Heinrich Graetz posited that the fourth captive was Nathan ben Isaac HaBabli, who settled, and was presumably sold, to the Jewish community in Narbonne.
