= Theli =

Theli may refer to:

- Theli (dragon), the name of the great dragon according to the Sefer Yetzirah
- Theli (album), album released in 1996 by symphonic metal band Therion

== See also ==
- The li (disambiguation)
