= Isaac ibn Ghiyyat =

Andalusian Jewish Talmudic scholar (1030/1038–1089)

Isaac ben Judah ibn Ghayyat (Note: Hebrew: יצחק בן יהודה אבן גיאת, romanized: Yiṣḥāq ben Yəhudā ʾībən Gayyaṯ, Arabic: ﺇﺑﻦ غيّاث, romanized: ibn Ghayyāth) (1030/1038–1089), commonly mispronounced ibn Ghiyyat, was a rabbi, Biblical commentator, codifier of Jewish law, philosopher, and liturgical poet from al-Andalus. He was born and lived in the town of Lucena in the Taifa of Granada, where he headed a rabbinic academy. He died in Cordoba.

== Etymology of name ==
As many Sephardic surnames, ibn Ghayyat is a nasab (patronymic), "the son of Ghayyāth." Ghayyāth means "savior" in Arabic. The name is commonly confused with ghiyath meaning "salvation", found in Saadia Gaon's Judeo-Arabic translation of Hebrew: יֵשַׁע, romanized: yēšaʿ, lit. 'salvation' in Psalm 20:7, "Now I know that YHWH will give victory to His anointed, will answer him from His heavenly sanctuary with the might of salvation in His right arm (בג'ברואת גיאת' ימינה)."

== Background ==
According to some authorities, he was the teacher of Isaac Alfasi; according to others, his fellow pupil. His best-known students were his son Judah ibn Ghayyat, Joseph ibn Sahl, and Moses ibn Ezra. He was held in great esteem by Samuel ibn Naghrillah and his son Joseph, and after the latter died in the 1066 Granada massacre, ibn Ghayyat was elected to succeed him as rabbi of Lucena, where he officiated until his death.

He was the author of a compendium of ritual laws concerning the festivals, published by Seligman Baer Bamberger under the title of Sha'arei Simḥah (Fürth, 1862; the laws concerning Passover were republished by Bernhard Zomber under the title Hilkhot Pesaḥim, Berlin, 1864), and a philosophical commentary on Ecclesiastes, known only through quotations in the works of later authors.

Ibn Ghayyat's greatest activity was in liturgical poetry; he was an author of hundreds of piyyutim, and his hymns are found in the Maḥzor of Tripoli under the title of Siftei Renanot. Most are written in the new Andalusi style. He achieved special distinction in his melodious muwashshaḥat "girdle poems", a secular Arabic form first used as a vehicle for liturgical poetry by Solomon ibn Gabirol.

One of his major contributions was his collection and arrangement of the geonic responsa, which had hitherto been scattered among the world's Jewry. Menahem Schmelzer, Albert B. and Bernice Cohen Professor Emeritus of Medieval Hebrew Literature and Jewish Bibliography at the Jewish Theological Seminary of America wrote his PhD thesis on the poetry of Ibn Ghiyyat and published several articles on his poetry.
