= Kairouan Synagogue =

Former synagogue in Kairouan, Tunisia

- Hebrew: בית הכנסת של קירואן
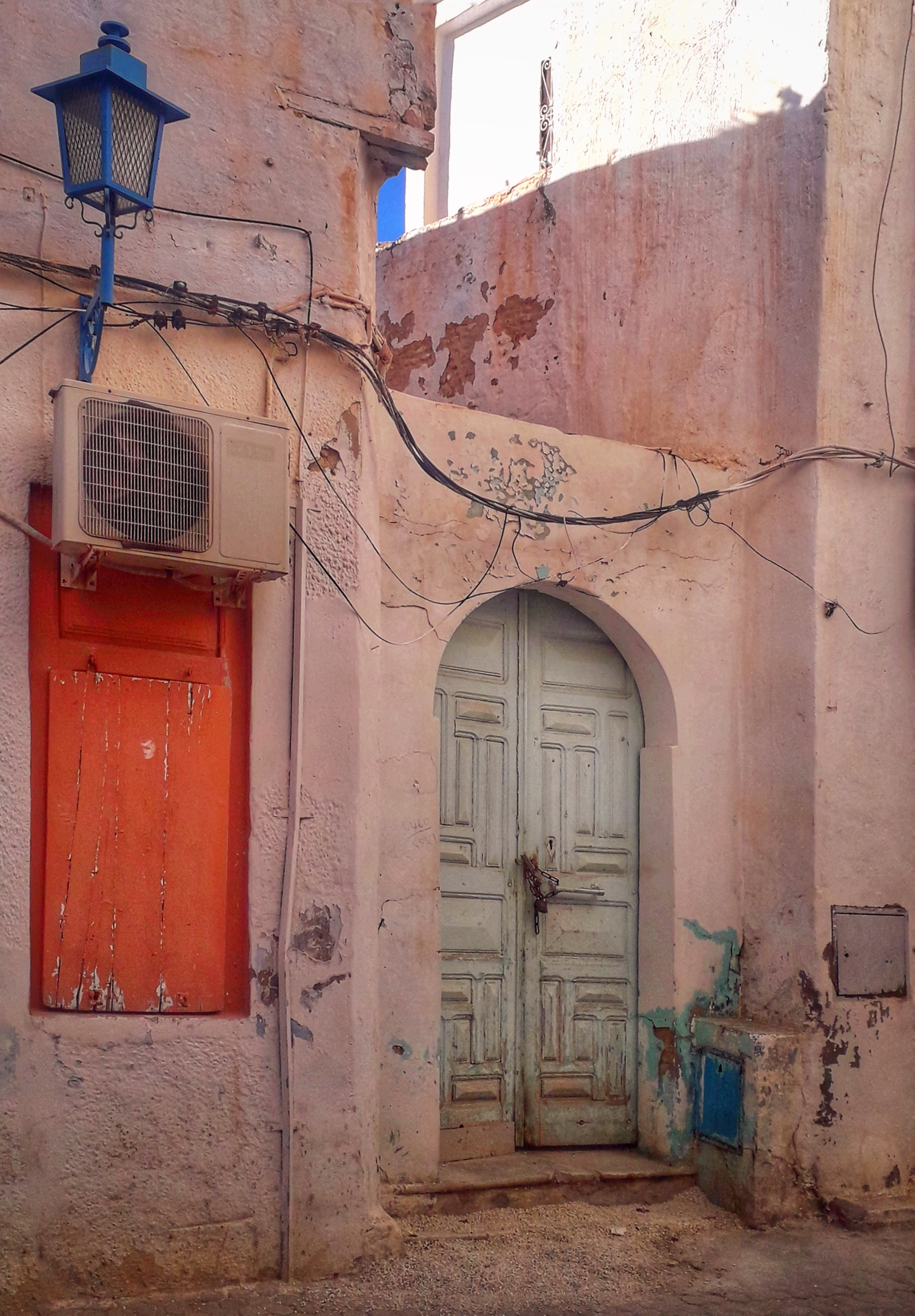
- Entrance to the former synagogue, in 2020

- Location of the former synagogue in Tunisia

Religion
- Affiliation: Judaism (former)
- Ecclesiastical or organizational status: Synagogue (1920–1970s)
- Year consecrated: 1920
- Status: Abandoned

Location
- Location: Kairouan
- Country: Tunisia
- Interactive map of Kairouan Synagogue
- Coordinates: 35°40′42″N 10°05′59″E

Architecture
- Completed: 1920

The Kairouan Synagogue (Hebrew: בית הכנסת של קירואן) is a former Jewish congregation and synagogue, located in Kairouan, Tunisia. The synagogue operated from 1920 until the 1970s.

== History ==
The city of Kairouan had a large Jewish community, which was formed when the city was founded. Kairouan is indeed the seat of the yeshiva of Kairouan, considered as the first important talmudic academy in North Africa and which was closely linked to the yeshivot of Babylonia. However, the community left Kairouan for other towns in Tunisia following its expulsion by the Almohads in the mid 1100s, after many Jews who refused to convert to Islam were killed. Under the dominance of the Hafsid dynasty in the late 1200s, the situation of the Jews in Kairouan improved notably, but it did not have the same splendor of its golden age.

The Jewish community of Kairouan was formed again during the French Protectorate of Tunisia, and it was not until 1920 that the city returned to have its vibrant Jewish past with the inauguration of a new synagogue located on the Salah-Souissi street. Motivated by the desire to assert its presence, the city's Jewish community chose in 1910 to acquire a plot of land in the heart of the hara to build its main religious building.

Around the 1970s, with the departure again of the Jewish community after the country's independence and the Six-Day War, the synagogue was made available by the Tunisian authorities in order to be used as a madrasa.

== See also ==
- History of the Jews in Kairouan
- Kairouan Yeshiva
- List of synagogues in Tunisia
