= Hanoch ben Moses =

Andalusian rabbi (d. 1014/1024)

Hanoch bar Moses
- חנוך ב"ר משה
- Died: 1014 CE or 1024 CE Córdoba, Al-Andalus
- Parent: Moses ben Hanoch (father)

Religious life
- Religion: Judaism

Jewish leader
- Predecessor: Moses ben Hanoch
- Position: Rabbi and Rosh Yeshiva of Córdoba

Hanoch bar Moses (Hebrew: חנוך ב"ר משה, romanized: Ḥənokh bar Moshe, died 1014 CE or 1024 CE) was a rabbi of al-Andalus. Almost all of the information we have about him comes from the Sefer ha-Qabbalah by Abraham ibn Daud.

== Life events ==
Along with his parents, Moses ben Hanoch and his wife (name unknown), Hanoch was captured by the Moorish pirate ibn Rumahis and brought to Córdoba. R. Hanoch eventually succeeded his father as rabbi and rosh yeshiva there, although for a time he faced opposition by Joseph ibn Abitur and by the latter's patron, Jacob ibn Jau, the lay leader of the Jewish community of the Caliphate of Cordoba. Hanoch was respectable by everyone that even his bitter adversary ibn Abitur (who has been exiled because of the ban issued by R. Hanoch on the latter) couldn't help but express his admiration for him, "I bring the heavens and earth as my witnesses that there is none equal to R. Hanoch, from Spain to the academies of Babylon."

His best-known student was Samuel ibn Naghrela.

Ibn Daud reports that relations between Hanoch and Hai ben Sherira were strained since the increasing stature of the Spanish yeshivot led to a lessening of their communities' financial contributions to the Talmudic academies in Babylonia. Indeed, Hanoch seems to have corresponded only rarely with the Babylonian geonim. However, Hai demonstrated his respect for Hanoch by honoring his excommunion of Joseph ibn Abitur and refusing the latter an audience.

R. Hanoch left no written works, although there are some extant responsa between him and Hai, as well as between him and the then-gaon in the Land of Israel, Samuel ben Hofni.

== Death ==
He died of injuries following a fall when the bimah in the Córdoba Synagogue collapsed on Simchat Torah. Ibn Daud dates this incident to 4775 (1014 CE) but also states that it was thirteen years before the death of Hai in 4798, so the correct reading should be 4785 (1024 CE).
