= Isaac Albalia =

Andalusian Jewish Talmudist and astronomer (1035–1094)

Rabbi Isaac ben Baruch Albalia
- Title: Nasi of Seville

Personal life
- Born: 1035 Cordova, Taifa of Cordova
- Died: 1094 (aged 58–59) Granada, Almoravid dynasty

Religious life
- Religion: Judaism

Isaac ben Baruch Albalia (Hebrew: יִצְחָק בֶּן בָּרוּךְ אַלבּאליה, Yiṣḥaq ben Barukh Albalia; 1035–1094) was an Andalusian Jewish mathematician, astronomer, astrologer, and Talmudist. He served as an astronomer in the court of Al-Mu'tamid of Seville.

== Biography ==
First educated by a Jew from Perigord, Albalia went on to the academy in Lucena, where he struck up a close friendship with Me'ir ibn Migash, father of Joseph ibn Migash, and then settled in Granada. When barely thirty years old Albalia began to write Kupat ha-Rokhlim ("The Peddler's Basket"), a commentary on the Talmud. He was a close friend of Samuel ha-Nagid, whose son Jehoseph ha-Nagid became Albalia's patron, to whom he dedicated his 1065 astronomical work Maḥberet Sod ha-Ibbur ("The Secret of Intercalation"), on the principles of the Jewish calendar. According to Moses ibn Ezra, Albalia was also a poet and rhetorician.

After the murder of Jehoseph ha-Nagid in the 1066 Granada massacre, Albalia fled to Cordova, where he became acquainted with then-prince Al-Mu'tamid ibn Abbad. When he ascended the throne of Seville in May 1069, Al-Mu'tamid appointed Albalia court astronomer and astrologer. At the age of thirty-one, just three years after he arrived in Seville, he was appointed leader (nasi) of the kingdom's Jewish community. Continuing as a palace official for twenty years, Albalia used his influence at court to improve the status of the Jews of the kingdom.

When in 1089 the recently arrived Almoravids imposed a purge of Jewish civil servants at the court of Seville, Albalia moved to Granada, where he spent the last five years of his life. Although he had strong disagreements with Isaac Alfasi, before his death he asked his son Baruch to go to Lucena and study with him. Alfasi adopted Baruch who eventually became a well-known scholar. Isaac Albalia was also the maternal grandfather of Abraham ibn Daud.
