= Dunash =

Dunash is a given name. Notable people with the name include:

- Dunash ibn Tamim (fl. 10th century), Jewish scholar
- Dunash ben Labrat (early 920s–after 985), Jewish commentator, poet, and grammarian
