= Joseph ibn Abitur =

Spanish rabbi of around the 10th century

Joseph ibn Abitur was a Spanish rabbi of around the 10th century. He was a student of Moses ben Hanoch.

Abitur was from a very prestigious Spanish family from the city of Mérida. His great great grandfather was a communal and Rabbinic leader. Besides being a great Torah scholar, Abitur was also a paytan of note. He also wrote a commentary on the Bible in Hebrew. When Moses ben Hanoch's son Hanoch was chosen to succeed his father, Abitur felt compelled to leave Spain and travel to the yeshivoth in Bavel. On his way he stopped in Egypt before arriving in Baghdad. He eventually went to Damascus, where he died. He wrote many teshuvoth, some of which are extant.

According to the history book Sefer ha-Qabbalah, during his stay in Egypt, Ibn Abitur produced an Arabic translation of the Talmud for the Fatimid Caliph al-Hakim bi-Amr Llah.

Most of Ibn Abitur's poems remain unpublished. In 2021, Dr. Yehoshua Granat published a monograph on Psalms and the poetry of Ibn Abitur, which includes an edition of 34 poetic compositions by Ibn Abitur, some of them massive works of hundreds of lines. Even this just begins to scratch the surface of publishing Ibn Abitur's poems, which number over a thousand.
