= Sefer Yetzirah =

Hebrew book on Jewish mysticism

Sefer Yetzirah (Hebrew: סֵפֶר יְצִירָה Sēp̄er Yəṣīrā, Book of Formation, or Book of Creation) is a work of Jewish mysticism. Early commentaries, such as the Kuzari, treated it as a treatise on mathematical and linguistic theory, as opposed to one about Kabbalah. The word Yetzirah is more literally translated as "Formation", the word B'riah being used for "Creation". (Note: In Hebrew, Yetzirah can mean either "creation" or "formation," but can also refer to the created or formed object itself. A work of art, for example, is called in Hebrew 'yetzira', as well as the action of creating it. Thus, the name Sefer Yetzirah could refer to the act of creating or forming the cosmos, or to the cosmos itself, or both. Since there is a specific Hebrew word for the creation of the cosmos (b'riah) it is more likely that the meaning refers to formation, or formed-object, or both.) The book is traditionally ascribed to the patriarch Abraham, although others attribute its writing to Rabbi Akiva or Adam. Modern scholars have not reached consensus on the question of its origins. According to Saadia Gaon, the objective of the book's author was to convey in writing how the things of our universe came into existence. Conversely, Judah Halevi asserts that the main objective of the book, with its various examples, is to give humans the means to understand the unity and omnipotence of God, which appear multiform on the one hand, and yet, are uniform.

The famous opening words of the book are as follows:

By thirty-two mysterious paths of wisdom Yah has engraved [all things], [who is] the Lord of hosts, the God of Israel, the living God, the Almighty God, He that is uplifted and exalted, He that Dwells forever, and whose Name is holy; having created His world by three [derivatives] of [the Hebrew root-word] s^{e}f^{a}r : namely, sefer (a book), sefor (a count) and sippur (a story), along with ten calibrations of empty space and twenty-two letters [of the Hebrew alphabet], [of which] three are principal [letters] (i.e. א מ ש), seven are double-sounding [consonants] (i.e. בג"ד כפר"ת) and twelve are ordinary [letters] (i.e. ה ו ז ח ט י ל נ ס ע צ ק).

== Origin ==
A cryptic story in the Babylonian Talmud states,

On the eve of every Shabbat, Rav Hanina and Rav Hoshaiah would sit and engage in study of Sefer Yetzirah, and create a delicious calf and eat it.

According to modern historians, the origin of the text is unknown, and hotly debated. Some scholars believe it might have an early medieval origin, (Note: Karr (2022): "The date of SY's [note Sefer Yetzirahs] composition remains a matter of some debate, though most scholars agree that it was written or compiled between the second and sixth centuries. However, Steven M.Wasserstrom has offered a strong case for the ninth century within an Islamic milieu. It was certainly extant by the tenth century, for it exerted a great influence on speculative and mystical thought from that time on.") while others cite earlier traditions appearing in the book. Most contemporary scholars date the text's authorship to the Talmudic period.

According to the Jewish Encyclopedia, the essential elements of the book are characteristic of the 3rd or 4th century; for a work of this nature, composed in the Geonic period, could have been cast only in the form of Jewish gnosis, which remained stationary after the 4th century, if indeed it had not already become extinct. The historical origin of the Sefer Yetzirah was placed by Richard August Reitzenstein in the 2nd century BCE. According to Christopher P. Benton, the Hebrew grammatical form places its origin closer to the period of the Mishnah, around the 2nd century CE.

The division of the letters into the three classes of vowels, mutes, and sonants also appears in Hellenic texts.

The date and origin of the book cannot be definitely determined as long as there is no critical text of it. The editio princeps (Mantua, 1562) contains two recensions, which were used in the main by the commentators of the book as early as the middle of the 10th century. The shorter version (Mantua I.) was annotated by Dunash ibn Tamim or by Jacob ben Nissim, while Saadia Gaon and Shabbethai Donnolo wrote commentaries on the longer recension (Mantua II.). The shorter version was also used by most of the later commentators, such as Judah ben Barzillai and Nachmanides, and it was, therefore, published in the ordinary editions. The longer recension, on the other hand, was little known, the form given in the editio princeps of the Sefer Yetzirah being probably a copy of the text found in Donnolo's commentary. In addition to these two principal recensions of the text, both versions contain a number of variant readings that have not yet been examined critically.

As regards the relation of the two recensions, it may be said that the longer form contains entire paragraphs which are not found in the shorter, while the divergent arrangement of the material often modifies the meaning essentially. Although the longer recension doubtless contains additions and interpolations which did not form part of the original text, it has many valuable readings which seem older and better than the corresponding passages in the shorter version, so that a critical edition of the text must consider both recensions.

=== Legendary origin ===
Mystics assert that the biblical patriarch Abraham used the same method to create the calf prepared for the three angels who foretold Sarah's pregnancy in the biblical account at Genesis 18:7. All the miraculous creations attributed to other rabbis of the Talmudic era are ascribed by rabbinic commentators to the use of the same book.

Sefer Yetzirah's appendix (6:15) declares that Abraham was the recipient of the divine revelation of mystic lore; so that the rabbis of the classical rabbinic era and philosophers such as Shabbethai Donnolo and Judah HaLevi never doubted that Abraham was the author of the book.

In Pardes Rimonim, Moses ben Jacob Cordovero (Ramak) mentions a minority opinion that Rabbi Akiva authored it, and takes it to mean that Abraham wrote it and Akiva redacted it to its current form. Jewish Lore attributes the Kabbalah to Adam, and holds that "[f]rom Adam it passed over to Noah, and then to Abraham, the friend of God."

In a manuscript in the British Museum, the Sefer Yetzirah is called the Hilkhot Yetzirah and declared to be esoteric lore not accessible to anyone but the truly pious.

=== Manuscripts ===
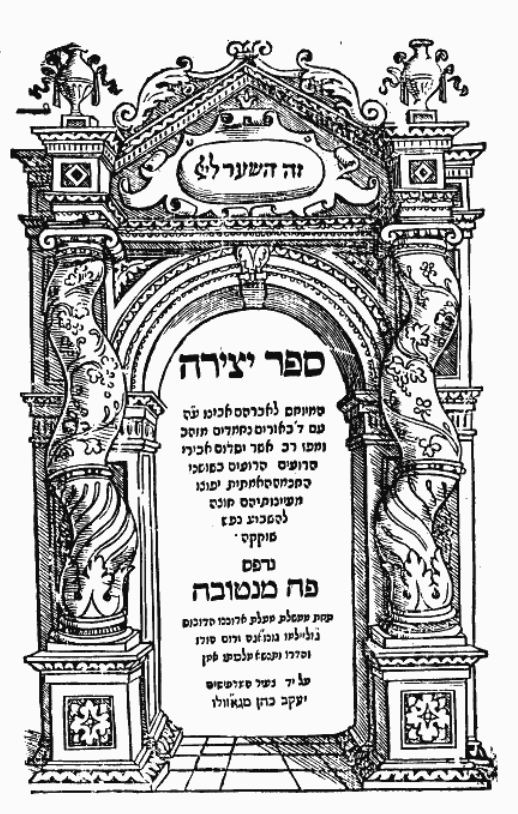
Title Page of Sefer Yetzirah, Mantua, Italy, 1562

The Sefer Yetzirah exists in many manuscripts, generally falling in categories known as:

1. The Short Version,
2. The Long Version,
3. The Saadia Version, and
4. The Gra Version

The long version contains entire paragraphs which are not found in the short version, while the divergent arrangement of the material often modifies the meaning essentially. The short version comprises about 1,300 words and was annotated by Dunash ibn Tamim, and it formed the basis of the first printed Hebrew edition, published in Mantua in the year 1562, and most main versions printed thereafter. The long version is 2,500 words and is present with a commentary by Shabbethai Donnolo. It is frequently printed with this commentary as an appendix to editions of the short Version. In the 13th century, Abraham Abulafia noted the existence of both of these versions.

The Mantua 1562 edition was printed with the short version surrounded by commentaries attributed to Abraham ben David (outside of the page), Nachmanides (bottom of the page) and Moses Botarel (inside of the page; the printer notes that Botarel followed the first two rabbis and also collected all other commentaries that preceded him). An appendix following this contains a pair of commentaries printed side by side, one attributed to Eleazar of Worms) on the outside of the pages and the other to Saadia Gaon on the inside of the pages. At the end of the volume is found the long version.

In the middle of the 16th century, the leader of the school of Safed kabbalists, Moses Cordovero, established a working text based on ten separate manuscripts. His student and successor Isaac Luria further redacted this to harmonize it with the Zohar, and then in the 18th century, the Vilna Gaon, known as "the Gra", further redacted it. This text is called the Gra or ARI-Gra version.

In the 10th century, Saadia Gaon wrote his commentary based on a manuscript which was a reorganized copy of the Longer Version, now called the "Saadia Version". This was translated into French by Lambert and thence into English by Scott Thompson. This version and commentary was more philosophical in nature rather than mystical and had virtually no impact on subsequent kabbalists.

== Influence ==
The Sefer Yetzirah is devoted to speculations concerning God's creation of the world. The ascription of its authorship to the biblical patriarch Abraham shows the high esteem that it enjoyed for centuries. It may even be said that this work had a greater influence on the development of the Jewish mind than almost any other book after the completion of the Talmud.

The Sefer Yetzirah is exceedingly difficult to understand on account of its obscure style. The difficulty is rendered still greater by the lack of a critical edition, the present text being much interpolated and altered. Hence there is a wide divergence of opinion regarding the age, origin, contents, and value of the book.

=== Jewish study ===
The history of the study of the Sefer Yetzirah is one of the most interesting in the records of Jewish literature. With the exception of the Bible, scarcely any other book has been the subject of so much annotation.

An intimate relation exists between the Sefer Yetzirah and the later mystics; and although there is a marked difference between the later Kabbalah and the Sefer Yetzirah (for instance, the sefirot of the Kabbalists do not correspond to those of the Sefer Yetzirah), the system laid down in the latter is the first visible link in the development of Kabbalistic ideas. Instead of the immediate creation ex nihilo, both works postulate a series of emanations of mediums between God and the universe; and both consider God as the first cause only, and not as the immediate efficient cause of the world.

A book of the same name was circulated among the Ashkenazi Hasidim between the 11th and 13th centuries, for whom it became a source of Practical Kabbalah. This book seems to be a mystic work on the six days of creation, and corresponded in part to the small midrash, Seder Rabbah deBereshit.

=== In Thelema ===
Charles Stansfeld Jones, in his book called The Anatomy of The Body of God has written interpretations of this book from the viewpoint of Thelema, a new religious movement founded by Aleister Crowley early in the 20th century.

== Teachings ==
=== Structure ===
The Sefer Yetzirah describes how the universe was created by the "God of Israel" (a list of all of God's Hebrew names appears in the first sentence of the book) through "32 wondrous ways of wisdom":

- Ten Numbers (sefirot, the origin for the sefirot of later Kabbalah)
- The Twenty-Two Letters of the Hebrew alphabet—
  - Three mother letters (Aleph, Mem, Shin)
  - Seven doubles (Bet, Gimel, Dalet, Kaph, Pe, Resh, Taw)
  - Twelve simples or elementals (He, Waw, Zayin, Heth, Teth, Yodh, Lamedh, Nun, Samekh, Ayin, Tsade, Qoph)

The book describes the method for using the ten sefirot and the 22 Hebrew letters to gain Divine Insight/Secret using Abraham's tongue. God's covenant with Abraham is described as being twofold.

=== The phonetic system ===
The philological is discussed first, since it is necessary for an elucidation of the philosophical speculations of the work. The twenty-two letters of the Hebrew alphabet are classified both with reference to the position of the vocal organs in producing the sounds, and with regard to sonant intensity. In contrast to the Jewish grammarians, who assumed a special mode of articulation for each of the five groups of sounds, the Sefer Yetzirah says that no sound can be produced without the tongue, to which the other organs of speech merely lend assistance. Hence the formation of the letters is described as follows:

- With the tip of the tongue and the throat
- Between the lips and the tip of the tongue
- In the middle of the tongue
- By the tip of the tongue
- By the tongue, which lies flat and stretched, and by the teeth (ii. 3)

The letters are distinguished, moreover, by the intensity of the sound necessary to produce them, and are accordingly divided into:

- Mutes, which are unaccompanied by sound, such as Mem
- Sibilants, such as Shin, which is therefore called the "hissing shin"
- Aspirates, such as Aleph, which holds a position between the mutes and sibilants, and is designated as the "airy Aleph, which holds the balance in the middle" (iv. 1; in some eds. ii. 1)

Besides these three letters, which are called "mothers," a distinction is also drawn between the seven "double" letters, which have two different sounds according to inflection, and the twelve "simple" letters, the remaining characters of the alphabet which represent only one sound each.

=== Themes ===
Both the macrocosm (the universe) and the microcosm (human) are viewed in this system as products of the combination and permutation of these mystic characters, and such a use of the letters by the Jews for the formation of the Holy Name for thaumaturgical purposes is attested by magic papyri that quote an "Angelic Book of Moses", which was full of allusions to biblical names.

The linguistic theories of the author of the Sefer Yetzirah are an integral component of its philosophy, its other parts being astrological and Gnostic cosmogony. The three letters Aleph, Mem, Shin, are not only the three "mothers" from which the other letters of the alphabet are formed, but they are also symbolic figures for the three primordial elements, the substances which underlie all existence.

According to the Sefer Yetzirah, the first emanation from the spirit of God was the ruach (רוּחַ rúaħ "spirit", "air") that produced water, which, in its turn, formed the genesis of fire. In the beginning, however, these three substances had only a potential existence, and came into actual being only by means of the three letters Aleph, Mem, Shin; and as these are the principal parts of speech, so those three substances are the elements from which the cosmos has been formed.

The cosmos consists of three parts, the world, the year (or time), and man, which are combined in such a way that the three primordial elements are contained in each of the three categories. The water formed the earth; heaven was produced from the fire; and the ruach produced the air between heaven and earth. The three seasons of the year—winter, summer, and the rainy season—correspond to water, fire, and ruach in the same way as man consists of a head (corresponding to fire), torso (represented by ruach), and the other parts of the body (equivalent to water).

The seven double letters produced the seven planets, the "seven days," and the seven apertures in man (two eyes, two ears, two nostrils, and one mouth.) Again, as the seven double letters vary, being pronounced either hard or soft, so the seven visible planets are in continuous movement, approaching or receding from the earth. The "seven days," in like manner, were created by the seven double letters because they change in time according to their relation to the planets. The seven apertures in man connect him with the outer world as the seven visible planets join heaven and earth. Hence these organs are subject to the influence of the planets, the right eye being under Saturn, the left eye under Jupiter, and the like.

The twelve "simple" letters were used to create the twelve signs of the zodiac, whose relation to the earth is always simple or stable; and to them belong the twelve months in time, and the twelve "leaders" in man. The latter are those organs which perform functions in the body independent of the outside world, being the hands, feet, kidneys, gall, intestines, stomach, liver, pancreas, and spleen; and they are, accordingly, subject to the twelve signs of the Zodiac.

In its relation to the construction of the cosmos, matter consists of the three primordial elements; they are not chemically connected with one another, but modify one another only physically. Power (δύναμις) emanates from the seven and the twelve heavenly bodies, or, in other words, from the planets and the signs of the zodiac. The "dragon" rules over the world (matter and the heavenly bodies); the sphere rules time; and the heart rules over the human body. The author sums up this explanation in a single sentence: "The dragon is like to a king on his throne, the sphere like a king traveling in his country, and the heart like a king at war."

=== Creation ===
To harmonize the Genesis creation narrative, which is a creatio ex nihilo, with the doctrine of the primordial elements, the Sefer Yetzirah assumes a double creation, one ideal and the other real.

Their name is possibly derived from the fact that as numbers express only the relations of two objects to each other, so the ten sefirot are only abstractions and not realities. Again, as the numbers from two to ten are derived from the number one, so the ten Sefirot are derived from one "their end is fixed in their beginning, as the flame is bound to the coal" (i. 7). Hence the Sefirot must not be conceived as emanations in the ordinary sense of the word, but rather as modifications of the will of God, which first changes to air, then becomes water, and finally fire, the last being no further removed from God than the first. The Sefer Yetzirah shows how the sefirot are a creation of God and the will of God in its varied manifestations.

Besides these abstract ten sefirot, which are conceived only ideally, the twenty-two letters of the alphabet produced the material world, for they are real, and are the formative powers of all existence and development. By means of these elements the actual creation of the world took place, and the ten sefirot, which before this had only an ideal existence, became realities. This is, then, a modified form of the Talmudic doctrine that God created heaven and earth by means of letters (Berakhot 55a). The explanation on this point is obscure since the relation of the twenty-two letters to the ten sefirot is not clearly defined.

The first sentence of the book reads: "Thirty-two paths, marvels of wisdom, hath God engraved...," these paths being then explained as the ten sefirot and the twenty-two letters. While the sefirot are expressly designated as "abstracts", it is said of the letters: "Twenty-two letters: God drew them, hewed them, combined them, weighed them, interchanged them, and through them produced the whole creation and everything that is destined to come into being" (ii. 2).

The letters are neither independent substances nor yet as mere forms. They seem to be the connecting-link between essence and form. They are designated as the instruments by which the real world, which consists of essence and form, was produced from the sefirot, which are merely formless essences.

=== Theories of contrast in nature ===
In addition to the doctrine of the Sefirot and the letters, the theory of contrasts in nature, or of the syzygies ("pairs"), as they are called by the Gnostics, occupies a prominent place in the Sefer Yetzirah. This doctrine is based on the assumption that the physical as well as the spiritual world consist of pairs mutually at war, but equalized by the unity, God. Thus in the three prototypes of creation the contrasting elements fire and water are equalized by air; corresponding to this are the three "Rulers" among the letters, the mute Mem contrasting with the hushing Shin, and both being equalized by Aleph.

Seven pairs of contrasts are enumerated in the life of man:

- Life and death
- Peace and war
- Wisdom and folly
- Wealth and poverty
- Beauty and ugliness
- Fertility and sterility
- Lordship and servitude (iv. 3).

From these premises the Sefer Yetzirah draws the important conclusion that subjective "good and evil" have no real existence, for since everything in nature can exist only by means of its contrast, a thing may be called good or evil according to its influence over man by the natural course of the contrast.

The book teaches that man is a free moral agent, and therefore a person is rewarded or punished for his or her actions. While the ideas of heaven and hell are left unmentioned in the book, it teaches that the virtuous man is rewarded by a favorable attitude of nature, while the wicked man finds it hostile to him.

=== Gnostic elements ===
Sefer Yetzirah is similar to various Gnostic systems. As the Sefer Yetzirah divides the Hebrew alphabet into three groups, so the Gnostic Marcus divided the Greek letters into three classes, regarded by him as the symbolic emanations of the three powers which include the whole number of the upper elements.

Both systems attach great importance to the power of the combinations and permutations of the letters in explaining the genesis and development of diversity from unity. The Clementine literature present another form of gnosis that agrees with the Sefer Yetzirah. As in the latter, God is not only the beginning but also the end of all things, so in the former He is the arche (Koine Greek: ἀρχή, Hebrew: ראשית) and telos (τέλος, תכלית) of all that exists; and the Clementine writings furthermore teach that the spirit of God is transformed into pneuma (πνεῦμα, רוח), and this into water, which becomes fire and rocks, thus agreeing with the Sefer Yetzirah, where the pneuma, air, water, and fire are the first four Sefirot.

The remaining six Sefirot, or the limitations of space by the three dimensions in a twofold direction, are also found in the Clementina, where God is described as the boundary of the universe and the source of the six infinite dimensions.

The "theli" (תלי teli, perhaps meaning "curled one" as a coiled serpent) which plays such a vital part in the astrology of the book, is probably an ancient Semitic figure; at all events its name is an Akkadian loan-word. The "dragon" is often understood as the starry constellation Draco and by extension it represents the cosmic axis (equivalent to the north/south pole) because this constellation coils around Polaris and thus around the celestial axis, as it intersects the northernmost part of the celestial sphere.

=== Factorial ===
In discussing the number of words that can be formed from the Hebrew alphabet, Sefer Yetzirah includes one for the earliest known descriptions of the mathematical function factorial, enumerating its first seven values and emphasizing its rapid growth.

== Influence ==
In 2002, American mathematician Robert P. C. de Marrais named the pathions, or the 32-dimensional hypercomplex numbers, after the 32 paths of wisdom in the Sefer Yetzirah.

== Editions and translations ==
First edition

- ספר יצירה (in Hebrew). Mantua. 1562 – via National Library of Israel.

Other important editions

- ספר יצירה (in Hebrew). Amsterdam. 1642.
- ספר יצירה (in Hebrew). Grodno. 1806 – via Hebrewbooks.org. Includes five commentaries.
- ספר יצירה (in Hebrew). Warsaw. 1884. Includes nine commentaries.
- Goldschmidt, Lazarus, ed. (1894). Das Buch der Schöpfung (Sepher Jezirah). Kritisch redigierter Text, Übersetzung und Kommentar. Frankfort-on-the-Main – via Hebrewbooks.org.

=== Translations ===
Latin

- Postell, Guillaume (1552). Abraham Patriarchœ Liber Iezirah (in Latin). Paris: Guillaume Postell.
- Pistor, Johann Ludwig (1587). "Liber de Creatione". Ars Cabalistica (in Latin). Basel: Conrad Waldkirch.
- Rittangel, Johann Stephan (1642). Sefer Yetzirah (in Latin). Amsterdam: Menasseh ben Israel.

German

- von Meyer, Johann Friedrich (1830). Das Buch Yezira (in German). Leipzig: F. A. Brockhaus.

English

- Kalisch, Isidor (1877). Sepher Yezirah: A Book on Creation; or the Jewish Metaphysics of Remote Antiquity. New York: L. H. Frank & Co. – via Hebrewbooks.org.
- Westcott, William Wynn (1887). Sepher Yezirah. London: Theosophical Publishing Society – via Sacred-texts.com.
- Kaplan, Aryeh (1991). "The Sefer Yetzirah: Short Version". Psyche.com.
- Solomon, Avi (2024). "Book Of Creativity". Patreon.com.

French

- Karppe, S. (1901). Etude sur les Origines et la Nature du Zohar (in French). Paris: Emile Bouillon. pp. 139–158.

== See also ==
- Jewish views on astrology
- Primary texts of Kabbalah
