= Bernhard Zomber =

- Born: 1821; Lask, Congress Poland
- Died: 1884 (aged 62–63); Berlin, Prussia, German Empire

Bernhard (Dov Bär) Zomber (Yiddish: דוב־בער צאמבער, romanized: Dov-Ber Tsomber; 1821–1884) was a Polish rabbinic scholar.

== Biography ==
Bernhard Zomber was born in Lask, Poland, in 1821. Having acquired a fair knowledge of rabbinical literature in his native country, he went to Germany to study under Joseph Shapiro in Inowrazlaw and Jacob Ettinger in Altona. He latter attended the Universities of Würzburg and Berlin. In 1871, Zomber assumed the role of principal teacher at the Bet ha-Midrash of Berlin, a position he held until his death.

Zomber's scholarly contributions include Hilkhot Pesaḥim, a commentary on Passover laws compiled by Isaac ibn Ghiyyat, accompanied by Zomber's own commentary under the title Devar Halakhah; Ma'amar, an essay on Rashi's commentary on the tractates of Nedarim and Mo'ed Ḳaṭan; Moreh derekh, a compilation of the commentaries of Gershon Me'or ha-Golah and Rashi on Mo'ed Ḳaṭan; and Shiṭṭah Meḳubbeẓet, a collection of novellæ by Bezalel Ashkenazi on Nedarim.

In addition to these works, Zomber contributed a number of articles to Jewish scholarly periodicals. Significantly, he authored a study on Judah ben Yaḳar, an early commentator on the Jerusalem Talmud, first published in the Monatsschrift für die Geschichte und Wissenschaft des Judenthums in 1860. An expanded Hebrew version was printed in Ha-Karmel in 1863.

== Selected publications ==
- Shiṭah meḳubetset ʻal masekhet Nedarim. Berlin: Kornegg. 1860.
- Hilkhot Pesaḥim. Berlin: M. Poppelauer. 1864.
- Maʼamar ʻal perush Rashi leha-masekhtot Nedarim u-Moʻed Ḳaṭan. Berlin: J. Benzian. 1867.
- Moreh derekh. Berlin: R. Siebert. 1870.
