= Shemariah ben Elhanan =

Shemariah ben Elhanan was head of the yeshivah of Cairo, Egypt, about the end of the 10th century. Abraham ibn Daud relates that Ibn Rumais (or Ibn Demahin), an Arab admiral, had captured four scholars who were voyaging from Bari to Sebaste to collect money for the maintenance of the great school in Babylonia ("haknasat kallah"), and that one of the four was called Shemariah b. Elhanan. Shemariah was sold by his captor at Alexandria, where he was afterward ransomed by rich Jews.

Shemariah then went to Cairo, where he founded a flourishing school. As to the native place of the captured scholars, the general opinion, more particularly with regard to Shemariah, is that the four were Babylonians, I.H. Weiss being the only authority who assigns them to Italy. David Kaufmann thinks they came from Pumbedita. This opinion, at least with regard to Shemariah b. Elhanan, is confirmed by a fragment of a responsum apparently addressed by Sherira Gaon to Jacob ben Nissim at Kairwan, in which Shemariah is spoken of as the head of the yeshivah of Nehardea and as a high authority in rabbinics.

Later, also, when Shemariah was the head of the yeshivah of Cairo, he was consulted by many rabbis from distant countries, and S. Schechter has published a long letter addressed to Shemariah by Ḥushiel of Kairwan, who, according to Abraham ibn Daud, was captured with Shemariah, and another letter, by an unknown rabbi, also addressed to Shemariah.
