= Nissim ben Jacob =

Tunisian rabbi and exegete (990 – 1062)

Rav Nissim ben Jacob
- ניסים בן יעקב
- Title: Gaon

Personal life
- Born: 990
- Died: 1062
- Parent: Jacob ben Nissim (father)
- Era: 10th-11th centuries
- Notable work(s): Sefer mafteaḥ le-manʻ ūlei ha-talmūd, Siddur Tefillah, Sefer ha-Mitzvot, Hilkhot Lulav, Megillat Setarim, Sefer Ma'asiyyot ha-Hakhamim wehu Ḥibbur Yafeh meha-Yeshu'ah
- Known for: Talmudic commentary ha-Mafteach
- Other names: Nissim Gaon, רבנו נסים גאון

Religious life
- Religion: Judaism

Jewish leader
- Teacher: Chushiel, Jacob ben Nissim
- Based in: Kairouan, Tunisia
- Students: Isaac Alfasi, Ibn al Gassum

Nissim ben Jacob (Hebrew: ניסים בן יעקב), also known as Nissim Gaon (Hebrew: רבנו נסים גאון, lit. 'Our teacher Nissim the Gaon'; 990–1062), was a rabbi and Gaon best known today for his Talmudic commentary ha-Mafteach, by which title he is also known.

== Biography ==
Rav Nissim studied at the Kairouan Yeshiva, initially under his father, Jacob ben Nissim, who had studied under Hai ben Sherira and then Chushiel, who succeeded as head of the yeshiva. Nissim himself later became head of the yeshiva; in this capacity he is closely associated with Chananel ben Chushiel. His most famous student is probably Isaac Alfasi. Nissim maintained an active correspondence with Hai ben Sharira and with Samuel ibn Naghrillah, whose son Joseph married Nissim's only daughter in 1049.

Chushiel

Jacob ben Nissim
Nissim
Isaac Alfasi

Teachers
Students

== Works ==
The commentary Sefer mafteaḥ le-manʻ ūlei ha-talmūd (Hebrew: "The book of the key to unlocking the Talmud"; often, simply ha-Mafteach, (The Key), linked here) is essentially a Talmudic cross-reference. In it Rav Nissim identifies the sources for Mishnaic quotes, identifying obscure allusions to other places in Talmudic literature. He quotes from the Tosefta, Mekhilta, Sifre, Sifra, and from the Jerusalem Talmud, the explanations of which he sometimes prefers to those of the Babylonian Talmud. Nissim did not confine himself to quoting references, as he also discusses these in connection with the text; this work is thus also a commentary. The work was written on several tractates, and is printed, in many editions, on the page itself.

He is also the author of the Judeo-Arabic narrative work al-Faraǧ baʿd al-Šidda (Consolation after Adversity), which in his words is "the entire history of the Jews 'with the exception of that included in the Scroll of Esther, the Scroll of the Hasmoneans, and the 24 books [of the Bible].'" It follows the structure of cyclical suffering and redemption seen by Yosef Hayim Yerushalmi as typical of medieval historiography, relating damage done in Kairouan by the Banu Hilal and Banu Sulaym in 1057. It includes Megillat Antiochus in addition to post-biblical material. An Arabic analog to his work in the "relief from adversity" genre is Al-Muhassin Al-Tanukhi.

Nissim also wrote other works, some of which have been lost but are quoted by later sages:

- "Siddur Tefillah", a siddur (prayerbook)
- A commentary on the Torah (now lost)
- A "Sefer ha-Mitzvot" on the commandments (now lost)
- "Hilkhot Lulav" a polemic against the Karaites (now lost)
- "Megillat Setarim": a collection of notes concerning halakhic decisions, explanations, and midrashim, primarily a note-book for the author's private use, and published by his pupils probably not until after his death.
- A collection of tales, "Sefer Ma'asiyyot ha-Hakhamim wehu Ḥibbur Yafeh meha-Yeshu'ah": about sixty tales, based upon the Mishnah, Baraita, the two Talmuds, and the midrashic writings; and written at the request of Nissim's father-in-law, Dunash, on the loss of his son.

== Literary portrayals ==
R. Nissim appears as a character in A Delightful Compendium of Consolation: A Fabulous Tale of Romance, Adventure and Faith in the Medieval Mediterranean, a novel by Burton Visotzky. The novel expands on the few known biographical facts (including the marriage of his daughter). Its title, A Delightful Compendium, derives from "Ḥibbur Yafeh".

== See also ==
- History of the Jews in Kairouan
- History of the Jews in Tunisia

Rosh Yeshiva
Preceded by Chushiel ben Elchanan	Rosh Yeshiva of Kairouan; With: Chananel ben Chushiel	Succeeded by None
