= Theli (dragon) =

Jewish mystical cosmic dragon

Theli (Hebrew: תְּלִי, Təlī; also translated as Tali, Thele, T'li, etc.), according to the Sefer Yetzirah, the earliest extant work of Jewish mysticism, is a celestial being who surrounds the universe. Theli is briefly mentioned in two verses of the Sefer Yetzirah. He is described as "above the universe, as a king on his throne". However, his overall purpose is never elaborated upon, and the Sefer Yetzirah itself does not attribute a particular form to Theli. Despite this, in the few sources which mention him, Theli is generally envisioned as a dragon.

Shabbethai Donnolo, in his commentary on the Sefer Yetzirah, the Hakhmoni, envisioned Theli as a "cosmic dragon" which possessed great power within the universe, and governed both planets and constellations. Saadia Gaon, in his own commentary on the Sefer Yetzirah, sought to explain Theli in purely astronomical terms, and recognized he was not merely a constellation resembling a dragon, although Isidor Kalisch identified Theli with Draco. Ibn Ezra remarked that he was uncertain of what Theli constituted, instead identifying him with Leviathan as a tannin, or sea monster. The Vilna Gaon shares this identification of Theli as a tannin, while still asserting its supremacy over the signs of the zodiac.

The etymology of Theli is uncertain, and the term does not resemble tannin, nakhash (“serpent”), or any other Hebrew word which became associated with “dragon” in later Jewish thought. It could be that it comes from attalū, which is the Akkadian name of a serpent according to the ancients swallows up the sun and causes its eclipse.
