= Yosef ha-Nagid =

Jewish rabbi, scholar, poet and statesman in Muslim Spain (1035-66)

Personal life
- Born: September 15, 1035 Granada, al-Andalus
- Died: 1066 Granada, al-Andalus
- Parent: Samuel ha-Nagid (father)
- Occupation: Torah scholar, poet, communal leader

Religious life
- Religion: Judaism
- Denomination: Sephardi Judaism
- Profession: Vizier of the Taifa of Granada

Jewish leader
- Yeshiva: Granada

Yosef ben Shmuel ha-Levi ha-Nagid (Joseph ibn Naghrela, or Joseph ha-Nagid; Hebrew: רבי יהוסף בן שמואל הלוי הנגיד Ribbi Yehosef ben Shemu'el ha-Lewi ha-Nagid; Arabic: ابو حسين بن النغريلة ; translit. Abū Ḥusayn ibn Naghrīla; 15 September 1035 – 30 December 1066) was a Jewish rabbi, scholar, poet and statesman in the Taifa of Granada in al-Andalus, and one of the early Rishonim of the post-Geonic period. He was the son of Rabbi Samuel ha-Nagid and son-in-law of Rabbi Nissim ben Jacob of Kairouan. Yosef was a vizier to the Berber monarch Badis ibn Habus, king of the Taifa of Granada, during the Moorish rule of al-Andalus, and the nagid or leader of the Iberian Jews.

== Biography ==
=== Life and career ===
Yosef was born in 1035 in Granada, al-Andalus, the eldest son of the Talmudic scholar, politician, famous poet and warrior Rabbi Samuel ha-Nagid ibn Naghrillah. Some information about his childhood and upbringing is preserved in the collection of his father's Hebrew poetry in which Joseph writes that he began copying at the age of eight and a half. For example, he tells how once (at nine and a half, in the spring of 1045) he accompanied his father to the battlefield, only to suffer from severe homesickness, about which he wrote a short poem.

His primary education was provided by his father. Rabbi Yosef Ḥasday, in a poem about Samuel ha-Nagid, described Yosef at age twelve as "a young lion, a child full of delight … wise beyond his years, versed in the Mishnah, and illuminating hidden matters." On the basis of a letter to Nissim ben Jacob attributed to him, in which Joseph refers to himself as Nissim's disciple, it is possible to infer that he also studied under Nissim at Kairouan.

In his youth Yosef became seriously ill; after recovering, in 1049, he married the daughter of Rabbi Nissim of Kairouan. According to the first Raavad, his wife was pious and learned, though Yosef reportedly found her unattractive; it is possible he studied under his father-in-law during the latter's visit to Granada.

Upon the death of his father in 1056, Yosef succeeded him as nagid and head of the Jewish community of Granada for approximately nine years, directing at the same time an important yeshiva, until 1064. Among his students were Isaac Albalia and Isaac ibn Ghiyyat. The king of Granada appointed him to his father's position as chief vizier when Yosef was twenty-one. He proved effective in tax administration, civil governance, and foreign policy, and, like his father, served as a military commander and achieved victories in several battles.

Despite his political responsibilities, Yosef continued his Torah studies, delivered public lectures, and composed poetry. He financially supported Rabbi Isaac ibn Ghiyyat and Rabbi Isaac Albalia. Rabbi Ali ben Amram praised him in exalted terms.

Joseph launched into a series of backfired intrigues, mishandled and misjudged situations, resulting in the kingdom sliding into crisis. Tensions arose at court after Yosef supported the son of King Badis ben Habus, who reportedly hated him. When Badis was later poisoned, the public blamed Yosef. He then supported Badis's brother Maksan, but the crown prince accepted accusations implicating Yosef. According to the memoirs of Abdallah ibn Buluggin, Yosef falsely accused Maksan's mother, who was executed, and ordered the killing of Abu al-Rabi ibn al-Matuni, an uncle who supported the prince.

=== Character ===
Abraham ibn Daud describes Joseph in highly laudatory terms, saying that he lacked none of his father's good qualities, except that he was not quite as humble, having been brought up in luxury.

The 1906 edition of the Jewish Encyclopedia states, "Arabic chroniclers relate that he believed neither in the faith of his fathers nor in any other faith." Arabic poets also praised his liberality.

The most bitter among his many enemies was Abu Ishak of Elvira, who hoped to obtain an office at the court and wrote a malicious poem against Joseph and his fellow Jews. The poem made little impression upon the king, who trusted Joseph implicitly. Still, it created a great sensation among the Berbers.

== Death ==
According to the first Raavad, Yosef had been raised in luxury and "was proud to the point of ruin." His elevated status, and the presence of wealthy Jews in state service, stirred resentment among the Muslim populace. A religious scholar, Abu Ishaq, wrote a poem criticizing King Badis and inciting hatred toward Yosef, calling on believers to kill him.

Ibn Buluggin recounts that Badis grew cold toward Yosef, and that Yosef, feeling insecure at court, allegedly plotted to betray Granada to Almería. Over time he transferred several forts to their control. On 30 December 1066 (9 Tevet 4827), during a wine feast with Granada's officials, one drunken minister left the gathering and declared that Yosef had assassinated Badis. The mob erupted in violence, beginning the massacre of Granada's Jews. Yosef attempted to disguise himself by blackening his face, but he was found, dragged from his hiding place, and killed. His body was carried through the streets and crucified on the city gate. Hundreds of Jews were subsequently murdered. His remains were later buried near his father at the Elvira Gate.

Much of the narrative about his life derives from the historical work of his adversary Abdallah ibn Buluggin; portions of his testimony were accepted by modern scholars such as Haim Shirman.

== Aftermath ==
A contemporary Muslim poet who wrote an anti-Jewish poem claimed that “their chief ape (Yosef) built his house of marble and brought to it the finest spring waters,” leading some art historians to hypothesize that one of the central structures of the later Alhambra complex may have been Yosef's residence. According to Ibn Buluggin, it was a fortress built by Yosef in his final years as a refuge.

Surviving works by Yosef include a poem he wrote at age nine and a half with his father, a preface to his father's Dīwān, and a rhymed letter to his father-in-law Rabbi Nissim ben Jacob.

The first Raavad wrote that the fast of 9 Tevet—whose reason is traditionally unknown—was divinely ordained in anticipation of the Granada massacre. Scholar Shulamit Elitzur explained that Jews of the period were struck by the coincidence and retroactively gave it meaning.

Rabbi Moses ibn Ezra wrote of Yosef's death: “His death was not the simple loss of one man, but the destruction of the entire nation … He and his father were the glory of our people, granting us prosperity for some thirty-five years. But those years have vanished, and that generation is gone—and it all seems like a fleeting dream.” Rabbi Isaac ibn Ghiyyat composed two elegies in his memory.

== Family ==
According to Rabbi Gedaliah ibn Yahya in his chronologically unreliable Shalshelet ha-Kabbalah, Yosef's son Rabbi Abraham was forced to convert by a Spanish king and, upon refusing, was executed.

After Yosef's death, his wife and son, Rabbi Azariah, escaped to Rabbi Isaac ibn Ghiyyat, whom Yosef and Samuel ha-Nagid had honored. Ibn Ghiyyat intended to appoint Azariah as head of the community in Lucena, though both mother and son were still very young.
