= Abū Isḥāq al-Ilbirī =

Andalusian poet and faqīh

Ibrahim ibn Masud ibn Saad al-Tujibi known as Abū Isḥāq al-Ilbirī was an Andalusian poet and faqīh, author of a short dīwān or collection of poems. Abū Isḥāq is best known for his invective against the Jews of Granada, a poem linked to the massacre of Granada's Jewish population in 1066. In that poem, Abū Isḥāq attacked the Zirid minister Yusuf ha-Nagid, son of the famous politician, poet and scholar Samuel ha-Nagid, who preceded him in the office at the Zirid court. Yusuf himself was murdered during the 1066 riot. Abū Isḥāq is also known for his ascetic poetry (zuhd), which insists upon religious themes, as well as upon aging and the heedlessness of men.
