= Chananel ben Chushiel =

Late-Geonic/Early-Rishonic Talmudist

Chananel ben Chushiel or Ḥananel ben Ḥushiel (Hebrew: חננאל בן חושיאל), an 11th-century Kairouanan rabbi and Talmudist, was in close contact with the last Geonim. He is best known for his commentary on the Talmud. Chananel is often referred to as Rabbeinu Chananel – Hebrew for "our teacher, Chananel" (in Hebrew, רבנו חננאל, or abbreviated, ר״ח).

== Biography ==
Rabbeinu Chananel (c. 980–1055) was probably born in Southern Italy, likely Bari, an important rabbinic center in the late geonic period. Around the year 1005, his father Chushiel travelled to North Africa with the intention of making his way to Egypt. While waiting for his son to join him, Chushiel settled instead in Kairouan (modern Tunisia), at the time under the rule of Zirid Emirs on behalf of the Fatimids. R. Chananel studied under his father, who became head of the Kairouan yeshiva, and through correspondence with Hai Gaon. He is closely associated with Nissim Ben Jacob in the capacity of rabbi and Rosh yeshiva of Kairouan. His most famous student is Isaac Alfasi. According to R. Abraham Ibn Daud, R. Chananel was also successful in business and was said to be very wealthy and had nine daughters. It is rumored that Rabbeinu Chananel was buried in or near the Grand Mosque of Kairouan.

== Works ==
R. Chananel wrote the first extant systematic commentary on the Talmud, today included in the Vilna edition Talmud page on certain tractates. The commentary, only parts of which survive, addresses sections of the Talmud relevant to legal practice at the time of writing: the orders Moed, Nashim, and Nezikin. Some fragments have been recovered from the Cairo Genizah and are published in B. M. Levin's Otzar ha-Geonim, though certain fragments may in fact represent geonic material from which R. Chananel copied, in particular the work of Hai Gaon. R. Chananel's commentary presents a paraphrased summary and explanation of the main arguments in the gemara, omitting most of the non-legal sections (Aggada) as well as sections that R. Chananel considered too simple to warrant further explanation. A distinctive feature of the commentary is the presentation of the parallel passages from the Jerusalem Talmud. He is one of the most widely quoted commentaries by all the rishonim including Rashi, Tosafot and the Rif. His opinion is highly regarded in halacha and correct versions of the texts which is used as a basis for Maimonides and many other later halachic authorities. In places where we don't have his commentary, his opinion is usually known from other sources due to mass quotation from all the Rishonim. An edition of the commentary published by Vagshal covers tractate Berachot and order Moed, which also includes the Sefer ha-Mafteaḥ of his colleague Nissim Gaon.

R. Chananel also authored a commentary on the Torah, cited by many later Biblical commentators, chiefly Bahya ben Asher. This commentary is to some extent directed against the Karaites. While no full copy of this work survives, we possess many fragments of it; it has recently been published by the Mosad Ha-Rav Kook as a separate work, as well as in the Torat Hayyim Torah edition with commentaries.

Other works by Rabbeinu Chananel include responsa; a number of Rishonim attribute to him the anonymous "Sefer ha-Miktzo'ot," decisions on ritual law.

רבנו חושיאל
חננאל בן חושיאל
רי״ף

Teachers
Students

== See also ==
- History of the Jews in Tunisia
- History of the Jews in Kairouan

Rosh Yeshiva
Preceded by Chushiel ben Elchanan	Rosh Yeshiva of Kairouan; With: Nissim ben Jacob	Succeeded by None
