= Dunash ibn Tamim =

Tenth century North African Jewish scholar

Dunash ibn Tamim (Hebrew: דונש אבן תמים) was a Jewish tenth century scholar, and a pioneer of scientific study among Arabic-speaking Jews. His Arabic name was أبو سهل Abu Sahl; his surname, according to an isolated statement of Moses ibn Ezra, was "Al-Shafalgi," perhaps after his (unknown) birthplace. Another name referring to him is Adonim.

His first name seems to have been native to northern Africa, it was common among medieval Berbers. The younger contemporary of Ibn Tamim, Dunash ben Labrat, for instance, was born in Fez.

Details concerning Ibn Tamim's life and activities have been gathered principally from his Sefer Yetzirah commentary.

In this commentary, which was written in 955–956 CE, Saadia Gaon is mentioned as no longer living. The author refers, however, to the correspondence which was carried on when he was about twenty years of age between his teacher, Isaac Israeli ben Solomon, and Saadia, before the latter's arrival in Babylonia, consequently before 928; hence Tamim was born about the beginning of the tenth century.

Like his teacher, he was physician in ordinary at the court of the Fatimid caliphs of Kairouan, and to one of these, Isma'il ibn al-Ḳa'im al-Manṣur, Tamim dedicated an astronomical work, in the second part of which he disclosed the weak points in the principles of astrology.

Another of his astronomical works, prepared for Hasdai ben Isaac ibn Shaprut, the Jewish statesman of Cordova, consisted of three parts: (1) the nature of the spheres; (2) astronomical calculations; (3) the courses of the stars. The Arabian author Ibn Baitar, in his book on simple medicaments, quotes the following interesting remark on the rose, made by Ibn Tamim in one of his medicinal works: "There are yellow roses, and in Iraq, as I am informed, also black ones. The finest rose is the Persian, which is said never to open."

The Arabic original of Ibn Tamim's commentary on the Sefer Yetzirah no longer exists. In the Hebrew translations the manuscripts are widely dissimilar, and contain varying statements regarding the author. In several of these manuscripts Ibn Tamim is expressly referred to as the author; in one instance he is named again, but with his teacher, while in another Jacob ben Nissim is named, who lived in Kairouan at the end of the Tenth century.

It appears that Isaac Israeli, who is mentioned elsewhere as a commentator on the Sefer Yetzirah, actually had a part in the authorship of the work. But the majority of the statements contained in the commentary itself justify the assumption that Ibn Tamim was the author. He must, therefore, have selected the commentary of his teacher as his basis, while the finishing touch must have been given by Jacob b. Nissim. A short recension of the commentary (Bodleian MS. No. 2250) was published by Manasseh Grossberg, London, 1902.

== Ibn Tamim as Grammarian ==
In the history of Hebrew philology Ibn Tamim ranks as one of the first representatives of the systematic comparison of Hebrew and Arabic. In his "Moznayim" (Preface) Abraham ibn Ezra mentions him between Saadia Gaon and Judah ibn Ḳuraish, and speaks of him as the author of a book "compounded of Hebrew and Arabic."

Moses ibn Ezra says that Ibn Tamim compares the two languages according to their lexicographical, not their grammatical, relations, and in this respect is less successful than Abu Ibrahim Ibn Barun at a later period. The latter also criticized certain details of Ibn Tamim's book. In the Yetzirah commentary Ibn Tamim says: "If God assists me and prolongs my life, I shall complete the work in which I have stated that Hebrew is the original tongue of mankind and older than the Arabic; furthermore, the book will show the relationship of the two languages, and that every pure word in the Arabic can be found in the Hebrew; that the Hebrew is a purified Arabic; and that the names of certain things are identical in both languages."

In adding, "We have obtained this principle from the Danites, who havecome to us from the land of Israel," he certainly alludes to the well-known Eldad ha-Dani. Abraham ibn Ezra (commentary on Eccl. xii. 6) mentions the interesting detail that Ibn Tamim believed he could recognize the diminutive form of Arabic names in several noun-formations of the Biblical Hebrew (for instance, : II Sam. xiii. 20). The statement cited by Saadia b. Danan (end of fifteenth century), according to which Muslims believe that Ibn Tamim was a convert to Islam, is erroneous, and is probably because Ibn Tamim is often quoted by Muslim writers.
