= Moses ben Hanoch =

Andalusian talmudic scholar (d. ~965)

Moses ben Hanoch or Moses ben Enoch (in Hebrew: משה בן חנוך, Moshe ben Hanoch) was a medieval rabbi and a founder of Talmudic scholarship in Spain. He died about 965.

Moses was one of the four scholars who according to tradition, went from Sura, the seat of a once flourishing but then declining Talmudic academy, in order to collect contributions for that school. During a voyage from Bari, on the coast of Italy, they were captured by the Moorish-Spanish admiral Ibn Rumahis, who, according to the legend, became enamored of the beautiful young wife of Moses. In distress she asked her husband in Hebrew whether those who were drowned in the sea could look forward to resurrection, and when he answered, in the words of the psalm, "The Lord saith, I will bring again from Bashan, I will bring them again from the depths of the sea," she cast herself into the waters and was drowned.

Moses was taken to Cordova with his young son Hanoch, where he was redeemed by the Jewish community, in the year 945 or 948. While there, he went to the schoolhouse where he acted as a server, and sat in the corner listening quietly to the Talmudic discourse of the judge and rabbi, Nathan. At the time, the Jews of Cordoba were not well versed in the methodology of study of Talmud due to the centralization of Torah study in Babylonia. Some of Rav Nathan's remarks attracted attention, and Moses' detailed explanation of the passage quoted by Nathan, his use of Rabbinic Aramaic and his ready answers to all questions addressed to him astonished the whole assembly. Nathan, therefore, on that very day voluntarily resigned his office and confessed himself Moses' pupil. The wealthy community of Cordova showed Moses much honor and immediately elected him rabbi. Hasdai ibn Shaprut, rejoicing at this event, induced the Umayyad Caliph Abd al-Rahman III to order Ibn Rumahis to forgo the higher ransom which he, in consequence, was demanding for Moses. Moses organized an important school at Cordova, which was independent of the gaonate and was attended by many pupils; and through him Cordova became the seat of Jewish scholarship.

== Bibliography ==
- Sefer ha-Ḳabbalah, ed. Amsterdam, p. 41a;
- Jost, Gesch. des Judenthums und Seiner Sekten, ii. 399 et seq.;
- Frankel's Zeitschrift für die Religiösen Interessen des Judenthums, ii. 100 et seq., iii. 397 et seq., 422 et seq.;
- Grätz, Gesch. v. 336, 347 et seq., 542 et seq.
- Cohen, Gerson D. The Story of the Four Captives, p. 115
