= 1066 Granada massacre =

Mass killing of Jews by Muslim mobs in modern-day Spain

Coordinates: 37°10′37″N 3°35′24″W

- Location: Granada-Taifa of Granada
- Date: 1066
- Target: Jewish inhabitants
- Deaths: Unverified estimates of 4,000, including Joseph ibn Naghrela
- Perpetrator: Andalusian mobs in Granada
- Motive: Antisemitism

The 1066 Granada massacre took place on 30 December 1066 (9 Tevet 4827; 10 Safar 459 AH) when a Muslim mob stormed the royal palace in Granada, in the Taifa of Granada, killed and crucified the Jewish vizier Joseph ibn Naghrela, and massacred members of the city’s Jewish community.

== Massacre ==
Upon being accused of the poisoning death of the son of the king, Joseph found himself in a dangerous situation. In response, Joseph sent messengers to Al-Mutasim ibn Sumadih, the ruler of the neighboring Taifa of Almería, a traditional enemy of Granada. He promised to open the gates of the city to Al-Mutasim's army in return for his own installation as a subservient king. At the last moment, Al-Mutasim pulled out, and on the eve of the supposed invasion, news of the plot leaked out. When word reached the populace, they shouted that Joseph intended to kill King Badis and betray the kingdom.

On 30 December 1066 (9 Tevet 4827), mobs stormed the royal palace where Joseph had sought refuge. The Jewish Encyclopaedia (1906) states Joseph was "hiding in a coal-pit, and having blackened his face so as to make himself unrecognizable. He was, however, discovered and killed, and his body was hanged on a cross." In the ensuing massacre of the Jewish population, many Jews of Granada were killed. The 1906 Jewish Encyclopedia claims that "More than 1,500 Jewish families, numbering 4,000 persons, fell in one day." However the 1971 edition does not give precise casualty figures. The Encyclopaedia Judaica also confirms the figures: “According to a later testimony, "more than 1,500 householders" were killed".

Joseph's wife fled to Lucena, Córdoba, with her son Azariah, where she was supported by the community. Azariah, however, died in early youth.

According to the Orientalist Bernard Lewis, the massacre is "usually ascribed to a reaction among the Muslim population against a powerful and ostentatious Jewish vizier”.

Lewis writes:

Particularly instructive in this respect is an ancient anti-Jewish poem by Abu Ishaq, written in Granada in 1066. This poem, which is said to be instrumental in provoking the anti-Jewish outbreak of that year, contains these specific lines:

Do not consider it a breach of faith to kill them, the breach of faith would be to let them carry on.
They have violated our covenant with them, so how can you be held guilty against the violators?
How can they have any pact when we are obscure and they are prominent?
Now we are humble, beside them, as if we were wrong and they were right!

Lewis continues: "Diatribes such as Abu Ishaq's and massacres such as that in Granada in 1066 are of rare occurrence in Islamic history".

The episode has been characterized as a pogrom. Walter Laqueur writes, "Jews could not as a rule attain public office (as usual there were exceptions), and there were occasional pogroms, such as in Granada in 1066".

== See also ==
- Timeline of Jewish history
- Timeline of anti-Semitism
- List of massacres in Spain

== Sources ==
- Constable, Olivia Remie, Medieval Iberia: Readings from Christian, Muslim, and Jewish Sources. University of Pennsylvania Press, 2011. ISBN 978-0-812-22168-8

== Bibliography ==
- Munk, Notice sur Abou'l Walid, pp. 94 et seq.;
- Dozy, R. Geschichte der Mauren in Spanien, German ed., ii. 300 et seq.;
- Grätz, Geschichte vi. 55 et seq., 415 et seq.;
- Ersch & Gruber, Encyclopedia section ii., part 31, p. 86.;
- Molins, Viguera-Molins (2010). "Al-Andalus and the Maghrib (from the fifth/eleventh century to the fall of the Almoravids)". In Fierro, Maribel (ed.). The Western Islamic World, Eleventh to Eighteenth Centuries. The New Cambridge History of Islam. Vol. 2. Cambridge University Press: Cambridge University Press. ISBN 9780521200943.
- Medieval Sourcebook: Abraham Ibn Daud: On Samuel Ha-Nagid, Vizier of Granada, 11 Cent
- Nagdela (Nagrela), Abu Husain Joseph Ibn by Richard Gottheil, Meyer Kayserling, Jewish Encyclopedia. 1906 ed.
