= Isidor Kalisch =

American rabbi (1816–1886)

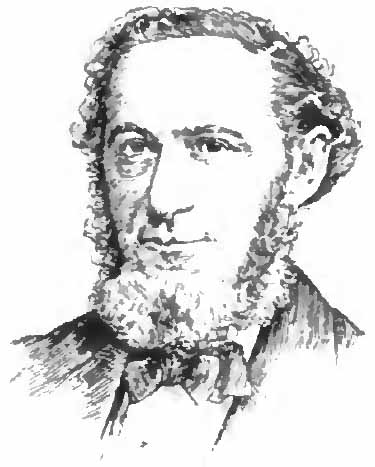
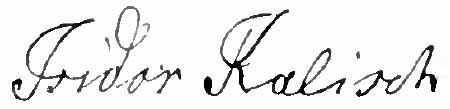

Isidor Kalisch (15 November 1816 – 11 May 1886) was an American reform rabbi and writer.

== Early life ==
He was born at Krotoschin in Prussia (now Poland), and was educated at Berlin, Breslau (Wrocław) and Prague.

While pursuing his studies in theology and philosophy, he contributed to German periodicals. In 1842 he wrote a patriotic poem, entitled "Schlacht-Gesang der Deutschen" (Battle song of the Germans) which was set to music and became one of the popular songs of the day. In 1843, he preached the first German sermon ever delivered in his native town.

== Rabbi in the United States ==
In 1848, he came to London, but passed on in 1849 to the United States. In 1850, was called to the Tifereth Israel congregation in Cleveland, Ohio, where he labored in the interest of Reform Judaism. In 1855, the first conference of rabbis was held in Cleveland, and a ritual and common prayer-book was agreed upon, entitled Minhag America, which he edited together with Rabbi Isaac Mayer Wise and found use in many synagogues. In 1855, he was requested by Prof. Josiah W. Gibbs, of Yale University, to decipher a Phoenician inscription that had been found in Sidon, Asia. His rendering of it was read before the Syro-Egyptian Society of London, 13 November 1855.

From 1856 to 1860, he had charge of a congregation in Milwaukee, Wisconsin where he united two factions and organized Die treue Schwestern (the true Sisters), a benevolent society of Jewish women. He then held charges in Indianapolis; Detroit; Leavenworth, Kansas; Newark, New Jersey; and Nashville, Tennessee where he erected a synagogue.

== Literary work ==
He returned to Newark in 1875, and devoted himself to literary work and to lecturing, taking part in polemical discussions in behalf of the ultra-reform element in Judaism. His controversies with Rev. Isaac Leeser, arising from Dr. Kalisch's criticism of Leeser's English version of the Bible, and on the "Jewish Belief in a Personal Messiah," have become famous in the history of Jewish literature. From 1853 until 1878 he edited the Guide, and contributed a great number of essays and discourses to German and English religious periodicals.

== Works (partial listing) ==
=== Prose ===
- Wegweiser für rationelle Forschungen in den biblischen Schriften (1853; English translation by Dr. M. Mayer, of Charleston, S. C., 1857)
- English translation of Lessing's Nathan der Weise (1869)
- English translation of Sepher Yezirah, a Book on Creation, or the Jewish Metaphysics of Remote Antiquity, with notes and glossary, together with a "Sketch of the Talmud" (1877)
- English translation (from French) of Munz's History of Philosophy and Philosophical Authors of the Jews (1881)
- English translation (from Hebrew) of Ha-Tapnach, an imitation of Plato's Phaedor ascribed to Aristotle the Stagyrite (New York, 1885)

His contributions to Talmudical lexicography were published in the London Jewish Chronicle (1867) and in the Literatur-Blatt (Magdeburg, Germany, 1880).

=== Verse ===
- "Töne des Morgen-Landes" (Sounds of the Orient)
- "Die letzten Lebensmomente Moses" (The Last Months of Moses)
- "Die mystische Harfe" (The Mystic Harp)
- "Der Teufelstein" (Devil's Rock)
- "Gesicht der Seele" (Face of the Soul)
- Several hymns which are contained in the Reformed Hebrew Prayer-Book
