= Chushiel =

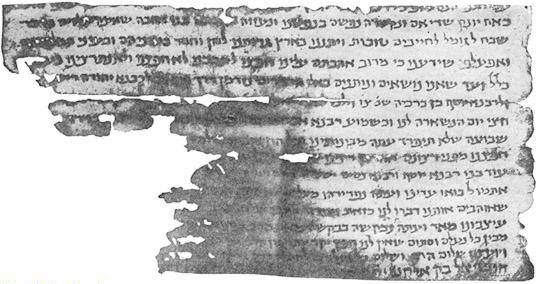
Portion of Cairo Genizah letter from Ḥushiel from the 1906 Jewish Encyclopedia

Ḥushiel ben Elḥanan was president of the beth midrash at Kairouan, Tunisia, toward the end of the 10th century. He was probably born in Italy, but his origins and travels remain obscure, and his eventual arrival in Kairwan is the subject of a well-known story.

חושיאל בן אלחנן
רבנו נסים	רבנו חננאל

Teachers
Students

== The Story of the Four Prisoners ==
According to the Sefer Ha-Kabbalah of Abraham ibn Daud, Ḥushiel was one of the four scholars who were captured by Abd al-Rahman III, an Arab admiral, while voyaging from Bari to Elaiussa Sebaste to collect money "for the dowries of poor brides." Ḥushiel was sold as a slave in North Africa, but Jewish communities ransomed him and the other three rabbis in Alexandria, Cordoba, and Kairouan. On being ransomed, Ḥushiel went to Kairouan, an ancient seat of Talmudical scholarship. There his Talmudical knowledge gained for him the position of president of the bet ha-midrash—probably after the death of Jacob ben Nissim.

However, an autograph letter from Ḥushiel discovered in the Cairo Genizah, addressed to Shemariah ben Elhanan, chief rabbi of Cairo (supposed by Ibn Daud to have been captured with Ḥushiel), tends to show that Ḥushiel merely went to visit his friends in Middle Eastern countries, and was retained by the community of Kairouan. It may therefore be the case that the story presented by ibn Daud is an etiological myth explaining the migration of Jewish centers of torah study from Babylonia to Spain and North Africa.

== Origins ==
There is considerable difference of opinion in regard to Ḥushiel's nativity. H. Grätz, Abraham Harkavy, and D. Kaufmann claim that he, with the other three scholars, came from Lower Mesopotamia, while S.J. Rapoport, I.H. Weiss, and Yitzhak Isaac Halevy Rabinowitz give Italy as his birthplace. This latter opinion is confirmed by the wording of the above-mentioned letter, in which Ḥushiel speaks of having come from the country of the "ʿarelim," meaning "Christian" countries. According to another but unreliable source, he came from Spain. Two of Chushiel's pupils were his son Hananeel and Nissim ben Jacob. According to the genizah letter, Ḥushiel seems to have had another son, named Elhanan, if "Elhanan" and "Hananeel" are not identical.

== Works ==
It is not known whether Ḥushiel wrote any book, but his pupils have transmitted a few of his sayings. Nissim ben Jacob reports that the story which the Talmud, without giving any particulars, mentions as having been related by Rav Papa was transmitted to him (Nissim) in full by Ḥushiel. Ḥushiel's son Hananeel quotes explanations in his father's name.

Ḥushiel was certainly one of the greatest, if not the greatest, of the Talmudical teachers of the 10th century. Samuel ha-Nagid, recognizing his importance and value, ordered that memorial services in his honor should be celebrated in Granada, Lucena, and Córdoba. Samuel also wrote a letter of condolence to Ḥushiel's son Hananeel. The letter, ending with a Hebrew poem in the Hazaj meter, and written in a very difficult style, praises Ḥushiel's knowledge and virtue, and compliments Hananeel.

== Complete letter of Ḥushiel ==
Below is a scan of the complete letter of Ḥushiel, from S. Schechter (1899) in Jewish Quarterly Review 11:644-650. Schechter there also provides a transcript of the portions that are legible, accompanied by a brief analysis of the grammar and contents. The shelfmark is T-S 28.1 (Taylor-Schechter Genizah Collection, Cambridge University Library).

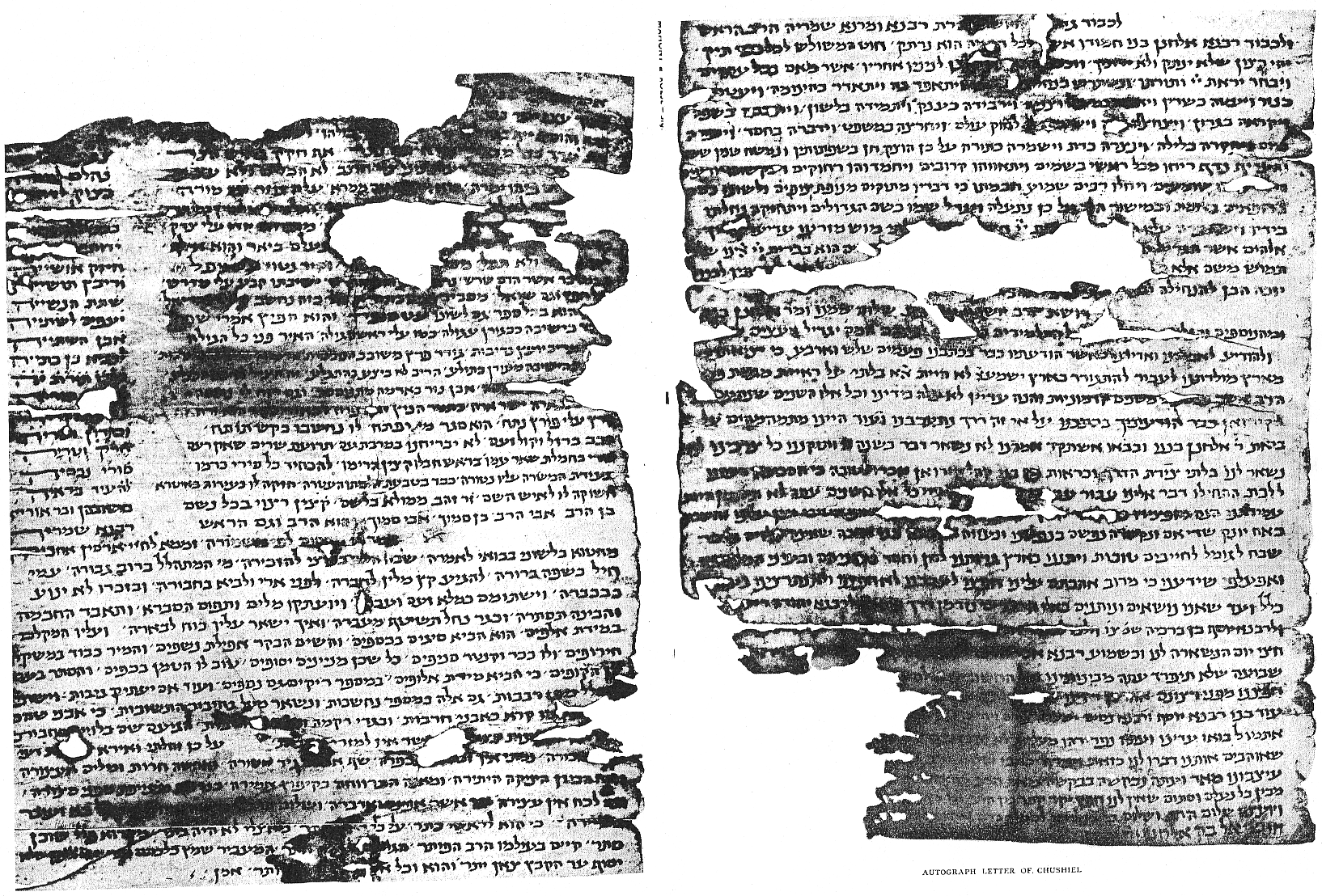

== See also ==
- History of the Jews in Kairouan
- History of the Jews in Tunisia

Rosh Yeshiva
Preceded by Jacob ben Nissim	Rosh Yeshiva of Kairouan	Succeeded by Chananel ben Chushiel; Nissim ben Jacob
