= Jacob ben Nissim =

Jacob ben Nissim ibn Shahin
- יעקב בן ניסים אבן שהין
- Born: 10th century Kairouan, Tunisia
- Died: 10th century

Philosophical work
- Region: Jewish philosophy
- Main interests: Sefer Yeẓirah, Indian mathematics
- Notable works: Commentary on Sefer Yeẓirah, Ḥisab al-Ghubar
- Notable ideas: Commentary on Sefer Yeẓirah, Ḥisab al-Ghubar

Jacob ben Nissim ibn Shahin was a Jewish philosopher and mathematician who lived in Kairouan, Tunisia, in the 10th century; he was a younger contemporary of Saadia. At Jacob's request, Sherira Gaon wrote a treatise entitled Iggeret, on the redaction of the Mishnah. Jacob is credited with the authorship of an Arabic commentary on the Sefer Yeẓirah (translated into Hebrew by Moses ben Joseph).

He asserts in the introduction that Saadia, while living in Egypt, used to address very insignificant questions to Isaac ben Solomon of Kairouan, and that, on receiving Saadia's commentary, he found that the text had not been understood by the commentator. Jacob therefore decided to write another commentary. In the same introduction Jacob speaks of Galen, repeating the story that that celebrated physician was a Jew named "Gamaliel." The Hebrew translation of Jacob's commentary is still extant in manuscript; excerpts from it have been given by M. H. Landauer and Dukes.

Jacob ben Nissim wrote a work on Indian mathematics under the title Ḥisab al-Ghubar (Hebrew: האבק חשבון).

His son and student, Nissim (referred to in later Rabbinic literature as Rabbeinu Nissim, or in Hebrew רבנו ניסים), later became the head of Yeshiva at Kairouan.

Rosh Yeshiva
New title	Rosh Yeshiva of Kairouan ?–1006	Succeeded by Chushiel ben Elchanan
