= Isaac Alfasi =

Maghrebi Talmudist and posek, commonly referred to as "the Rif" (1013–1103)

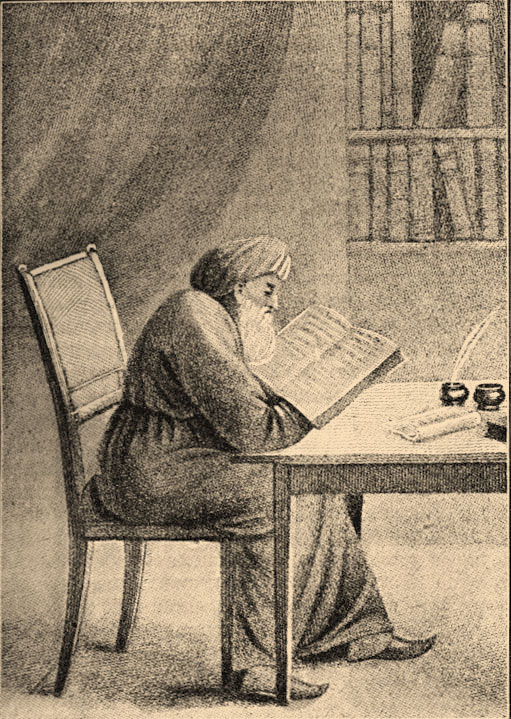
- Born: 1013; Qal'at Bani Hammad, now in Algeria
- Died: 1103 (aged 89–90); Lucena, al-Andalus
- Other name: Rif
- Occupation: Rabbi

Isaac ben Jacob Alfasi (1013–1103) (Arabic: إسحاق الفاسي; Hebrew: ר׳ יצחק אלפסי), also known as Alfasi and by the Hebrew acronym Rif (Hebrew: רי״ף; Rabbi Isaac al-Fasi), was a North African Maghrebi Talmudist, posek (decider in matters of Halakha) and codifier of Jewish law. He is best known for his Sefer ha-Halakhot ("Book of the Commandments"), regarded as the first fundamental work of halakhic literature and the best-known code of Jewish law before Maimonides' Mishneh Torah ("Second Law Code").

Sefer ha-Halakhot extracted the legal decisions of the Talmud and summarized those laws that remained applicable in Alfasi's own time. The work was highly esteemed; Maimonides wrote that "the Halakhot of the great rabbi, our teacher Isaac of blessed memory ... contains all the decisions and laws we need in our day". Joseph Caro later regarded Alfasi, Maimonides and Asher ben Jehiel as the three pillars of learning upon which Judaism rested and used their works as the foundation for his own Shulḥān Arukh ("Arranged Table").

== Biography ==
He was born in Qal'at Bani Hammad in modern-day Algeria, the capital city of the Sanhaja Hammadid dynasty of the central Maghreb, and is sometimes called "ha-Kala'i" because of it. Some older sources believe Qalaat Hammad refers to a village near Fez. Alfasi studied in Kairouan, Tunisia, under Nissim ben Jacob and Chananel ben Chushiel—recognized rabbinical authorities of the age. Ben Chushiel trained Alfasi to deduce and to clarify the Halakha from Talmudic sources, and Alfasi then conceived of the idea of compiling a comprehensive work that would present all of the practical conclusions of the Gemara in a clear, definitive manner. He worked in his father-in-law's attic for ten consecutive years to achieve this goal.

In 1045, Alfasi moved to Fez with his wife and two children, hence the name "al fasi". Fez's Jewish community undertook to support him and his family so that he could work on his Sefer Ha-halachot undisturbed. They also founded a yeshiva in his honor, and many students throughout Morocco came to study under his guidance. The most famous of his many students is Judah Halevi, author of the Kuzari; he also taught Joseph ibn Migash (the Ri Migash), who was in turn a teacher of Rabbi Maimon, father and teacher of Maimonides (Rambam).

Alfasi remained in Fez for 40 years, during which time he completed his Sefer Ha-halachot. In 1088, aged seventy-five, two informers denounced him to the government upon some unknown charge. He left Fes for Al-Andalus, eventually becoming head of the yeshiva in Lucena, Córdoba in 1089.

His "magnanimous character" is illustrated by two incidents. When his opponent Isaac Albalia died, Alfasi adopted Albalia's son. When Alfasi was himself on the point of death, he recommended as his successor in the Lucena rabbinate, not his own son, but his pupil Joseph ibn Migash.

Chananel ben Chushiel
Joseph ibn Migash

Nissim ben Jacob
Alfasi
Judah Halevi

Teachers
Students

== Sefer haHalachot ==
Sefer ha-Halachot (ספר ההלכות), also known as Hilchot haRif or Hilchot Rav Alfas (Hebrew: הלכות רב אלפס), was Alfasi's main work, written in Fez. It extracts all the pertinent legal decisions from the three Talmudic orders Moed, Nashim and Nezikin as well as the tractates of Berachot and Chulin - 24 tractates in all. Alfasi transcribed the Talmud's halakhic conclusions verbatim, without the surrounding deliberations; he also excludes all Aggadic (non-legal, homiletic) matter as well as discussion of the halakha practicable only in Land of Israel.

Generally the work follows the ordering of the Talmud, but sometimes Talmudic excerpts are moved from place to place, and very rarely non-Talmudic texts are incorporated into the work.

=== Impact ===
Maimonides wrote that Alfasi's work "has superseded all the geonic codes…for it contains all the decisions and laws which we need in our day…".

Sefer ha-Halachot plays a fundamental role in the development of Halakha. Firstly, "the Rif" succeeded in producing a Digest, which became the object of close study, and led in its turn to the great Codes of Maimonides and of Rabbi Joseph Karo. Secondly, it served as one of the "Three Pillars of Halakha", as an authority underpinning both the Arba'ah Turim and the Shulkhan Arukh. Nissim of Gerona (the RaN) compiled a detailed and explicit commentary on this work; in yeshivot, "the Rif and the RaN" are regularly studied as part of the daily Talmudic schedule.

This work was published before the times of Rashi and other commentaries, and resulted in a profound change in the study practices of the scholarly Jewish public in that it opened the world of the gemara to the public at large. It soon became known as the Talmud Katan ("Little Talmud"). At the close of the Middle Ages, when the Talmud was banned in Italy, Alfasi's code was exempted so that from the 16th to the 19th centuries his work was the primary subject of study of the Italian Jewish community. Alfasi also occupies an important place in the development of the Sephardic method of studying the Talmud. In contradistinction to the Ashkenazi approach, the Sephardim sought to simplify the Talmud and free it from casuistical detail; see for example Hananel ben Hushiel.

== Other works ==
Alfasi also left many responsa. These were originally written in Judeo-Arabic and soon translated into Hebrew as She'elot u-Teshuvot ha-Rif.

== See also ==
- History of the Jews in Algeria
- History of the Jews in Morocco
- History of the Jews in Tunisia
- History of the Jews in Kairouan
