= History of the Jews in Kairouan =

The Tunisian city of Kairouan (also known as Kairwan or El Qayrawan; Hebrew: קירואן; Arabic: القيروان; Tunisian Arabic: قيروان) was a world center of Talmudic and Halakhic scholarship for at least three generations.

== Early history ==
The first Jews arrived in Kairouan with its founders from the Cyrenaica region of what is today Libya, and a second wave of Jewish settlers arrived at the end of the 7th century. The community's golden era began in the late 8th century and lasted until the early 11th century, i.e. from the reign of the Aghlabids to the reign of the Hafsids. The city housed a synagogue, yeshiva, a cemetery, a community charity and other institutions. Jews in the city were in contact with the Babylonian academies of Pumbedita and Sura, and with Jewish communities in western Spain.

In 880, Eldad ha-Dani visited the city and the local community to describe his travels. He enthralled the audience with his fluency in Hebrew, and brought with him a collection of laws he claimed were practiced among the ten lost tribes. These laws puzzled the Kairouan Jews, and so they sent an enquiry to Rabbi Tzemach Ben Haim of the Sura Academy, who attempted to explain them and reconcile them with halacha. Other rabbis, including Rabbi Meir of Rothenburg and members of the Tosafists were not similarly sympathetic.

At the beginning of the 10th century, a Jew named Isaac ben Solomon Israeli (d. 950) taught at the Kairouan medical school and served as the personal physician to both the final ruler of the Aghlabid dynasty (amīr Ziyādat Allah III) and the first ruler of the Fatimid dynasty. He wrote works of Neoplatonic philosophy, and corresponded with Rabbi Saadia Gaon in Babylonia. A second Kairouan Jew, named Dunash ibn Tamim, was a physician and philologist, who also served as a doctor in the Fatimid court. A third Kairouan Jew of that era, Nathan HaBavli, (950) recorded his impressions of Babylonian Jewry in Seder Olam Zuta.

During the 11th century, the most prominent Jew in Kairouan was Abraham ben Nathan (Abu Ishāq Ibrahim ibn 'Ata), "one of the great Jewish leaders of his day", who in 1015 received the titles Naggid HaGolah (lit. "Prince of the Diaspora") and Rosh HaKehilot (lit. "Head of the Communities") from that generation's spiritual leader, Hai Gaon. He served as personal physician to Al-Mu'izz ibn Badis, the Zirid sultan of North Africa, and apparently also to the prior sultan, Badis ibn Mansur, Mu'izz's father.

One contemporary of Abraham ben Nathan, Judah ben Joseph, was the most prominent trader of the city, controlling trade routes across the Mediterranean and on to India. During war, when all other ships were barred from sailing, his merchandise was taken on royal warships belonging to the Sayyida, the Zirid Queen Regent.) Hai Gaon titled him Rosh Kallah, Rosh HaSeder and Salier (possibly derived from a Persian term for dignitary).

Both Abraham ben Nathan and Judah ben Joseph died in the same year, sometime in the 1030s.

== Kairouan yeshiva ==
Throughout this period, Kairouan was known as a center of Talmudic scholarship, and the Jews were in the city maintained halachic correspondence with communities from Spain and Europe to Babylonia, including with leading Torah authorities such as Rav Sherira Gaon, Rav Hai Gaon, and Shmuel Hanaggid. At the peak of the yeshiva's prestige, Egyptian communities would turn to the scholars of Kairouan, even though they were subject to the Rashut of the Land of Israel. Rabbi Yaakov ben Nissim led the Kairouan yeshiva the end of the 10th century. During his tenure, Rabbi Chushiel arrived in Kairouan from Italy, and upon Rabbi Yaakov ben Nissim's death, in 1006, succeeded him. Upon the death of Rabbi Hushiel, Rabbenu Nissim ben Jacob, son of Rabbi Yaakov ben Nissim, assumed the leadership of the yeshiva, and mentored Rabbenu Chananel ben Chushiel. During that same period, Rabbi Isaac Alfasi also studied in Kairouan, before moving to Fez, Morocco. Rabbenu Nissim died in 1062, and by the middle of the 11th century, the Kairouan yeshiva had lost its stature as a world center of Torah study.

== Decline and expulsion ==
During the eleventh century, the Banu Hilal conquest dramatically altered the cultural and political landscape of the land. As nomadic people, the Arab Banu Hilal invaded from the east while the Almoravid people invaded from southern Morocco. The nomadic group sacked the city of Qayrawan, destroying the first wave of Arab influence over the empire of Kairouan. The conquest of the city of Qayrawan caused a mass migration of the Jewish population from the area of Kairouan while creating an Arab stronghold over the land. Although this conquest destroyed the interior of the area, the coastal cities prevailed as cities such as Tunisia was still an important location for North African culture producing textiles, ceramics, glass, oil, soap, and other manufacturing goods. Another devastating outcome from the conquest was the destruction of irrigation systems within North Africa, leading to desertfication and nomadization of the area until European powers colonized North Africa for the resources.

The devastating Banu Hilal conquest of Kairouan in 1057 so utterly destroyed the city that it never regained its former cultural appropriation as the area became a blend of Arab and Berber cultures, and the size of the Jewish community declined significantly. The result of the conquest officially made Arabic the official language of North Africa at the time.

Religious persecution intensified in 1160 under the Almohad dynasty, which rejected dhimmi protections and forced non-Muslims to choose between conversion to Islam, exile, or death. The community disbanded in 1270 when the Hafsids forbade non-Muslims from living in the city; the remaining Jews were forced to convert to Islam or to leave." After the invasion, the area, once flushed with cultural excellence, became an impoverished land currently occupied by Tunisia and now Libya. The Jewish population that was previously living in migrated to areas such as Egypt and Sicily.

After Tunisia was established as a French protectorate in 1881, some Jews returned to the city. There were a number of Jewish shopkeepers and two synagogues were opened. When Germany occupied Tunisia during World War II, many of these Jews fled. Although some returned after the war, by the 1960s the Jews of the community had either moved elsewhere in Tunisia or migrated out of the country. Today there is no Jewish community. This emigration took place from 1946-1960 until the Jewish community was all but nothing in the place that was the cultural center for Jews 900 years earlier.

== See also ==
- History of the Jews in Tunisia
- History of the Jews in Africa
