= Abraham ibn Daud =

12th-century Spanish astronomer, historian and philosopher

- אַבְרָהָם בֶּן־דָּוִד הַלֵּוִי אִבְּן דָּאוּד
- Born: c. 1110; Toledo, Spain
- Died: c. 1180
- Other names: Rabad I, Ravad I
- Occupations: Philosopher, historian, astronomer

Philosophical work
- Era: Medieval philosophy
- Region: Jewish philosophy
- School: Aristotelianism
- Main interests: Jewish law, Ethics, Theology
- Notable works: Sefer ha-Qabbalah, al-ʿaqida l-Rafiya
- Notable ideas: Integration of Aristotelian philosophy with Jewish thought

Abraham ibn Daud (Judeo-Arabic: אַבְרָהָם בֶּן־דָּוִד הַלֵּוִי אִבְּן דָּאוּד, romanized: ʾAvrāhām ben-Dāvid hal-Lēvi ibn Dāʾūd; Arabic: ابراهيم بن داود, romanized: ʾIbrāhīm ibn Daʾūd) was a Spanish-Jewish astronomer, historian and philosopher born in Córdoba, Spain about 1110 who was said to have been killed for his religious beliefs in Toledo, Spain about 1180. He is sometimes known by the abbreviation Rabad I or Ravad I or Ravaad I or Ra'avad I. His maternal grandfather was Isaac Albalia. Some scholars believe he was the Arabic-into-Latin translator known as Avendauth.

== Works ==
His chronicle, a work written in Hebrew in 1161 under the title of Sefer ha-Qabbalah (Hebrew: ספר הקבלה, lit. 'Book of Tradition'; some manuscripts give the title as Seder ha-Qabbalah, i.e. the "Order of Tradition"), in which he fiercely attacked the contentions of Karaism and justified Rabbinic Judaism by the establishment of a chain of traditions from Moses to his own time, is replete with valuable general information, especially relating to the time of the Geonim and to the history of the Jews in Spain.

In his book, he attempted to explain how the pre-Inquisition Spanish Jewish community became the centre of the Jewish world by claiming that four rabbis from the Talmudic academies in Babylonia (Lower Mesopotamia), which had been the centre of Jewish scholarship for centuries, were travelling across the Mediterranean by ship in 990. Their ship was captured by a royal Spanish fleet, and all four were sold into slavery at different points around the Mediterranean. In each place where the rabbis were sold as slaves, the local Jewish communities bought their freedom. One of the slaves was Hanoch ben Moses, who was freed in Córdoba. When he began attending Torah classes and giving brilliant answers to questions, the community recognized him as a prodigious scholar and made him their leader; this transferred what Dara Horn called the 'crown of Torah' from Babylonia to Spain.

The account described in Sefer ha-Qabbalah contains numerous impossibilities and inaccuracies. Jewish historian Gerson Cohen noted that the alleged leader of the Spanish royal fleet, Abd al-Rahman III, died some thirty years before the story took place, and that the legend of Rabbi Moshe disguised as a pauper and surprising scholars in a Torah study session was nearly identical to the rise of Hillel the Elder.

The work was written in the aftermath of the Almohad persecutions of the Jewish community of al-Andalus and subsequent Jewish refugee establishment in the Christian world. Although Cohen has argued that Sefer ha-Qabbalah is an esoteric or messianic text with hidden meanings to explain its contradictions and errors, Eve Krakowski explains it as an affirmation of Jewish historical consciousness, with decisions made for polemical reasons and to counter Christian historical narratives.

An astronomical work written by him in 1180 is favourably noticed by Isaac Israeli ben Joseph. His philosophical work, al-ʿaqida l-Rafiya "The Sublime Faith", written in 1168, in Arabic, has been preserved in two Hebrew translations: one by Solomon ben Labi, with the title Emunah Ramah; the other by Samuel Motot. Labi's translation was retranslated into German and published by Simshon Weil.

== Philosophy ==
=== Aristotelian approach ===
Ibn Daud was the first to introduce the phase of Jewish philosophy which is generally attributed to Maimonides and which differs from former systems of philosophy mainly in its more thorough systematic form derived from Aristotle. He is considered the first Aristotelian in medieval Jewish philosophy; his work has been given less attention than Maimonides' subsequent and widely popular work The Guide for the Perplexed. Hasdai Crescas said Ibn Daud was the only Jewish philosopher among the predecessors of Maimonides.

The only Jewish philosophical works that Ibn Daud had before him, according to his own statement, were Saadia's Emunoth ve-Deoth, and "The Fountain of Life" by Solomon ibn Gabirol. On the one hand, he fully recognized the merits of Saadia Gaon, although he does not adopt his views on the freedom of the will, notwithstanding that the solution of this problem was to be the chief aim and purpose of his whole system. On the other hand, his attitude toward Gabirol was entirely antagonistic, and even in the preface to his "Emunah Ramah" he pitilessly condemned Gabirol's "Fountain of Life." He considered Aristotle and his Arabic commentators, Alfarabi and Ibn Sina, to be the only true philosophers.

True philosophy, according to Ibn Daud, does not entice us from religion; it tends rather to strengthen and solidify it. Moreover, it is the duty of every thinking Jew to become acquainted with the harmony existing between the fundamental doctrines of Judaism and those of philosophy, and, wherever they seem to contradict one another, to seek a mode of reconciling them. Ibn Daud insists that, however highly philosophy may be valued, the religion of Judaism is preferable. Knowledge, which had been acquired by philosophers through the evolution of several thousand years, and after overcoming the most serious errors, had been bestowed upon Judaism from the beginning through revelation. As to moral truths, it may be even assumed as probable that the philosophers did not attain to them through independent study, but rather under the influence of the doctrines of Holy Scripture.

=== Theology ===
As to the incorporeality of God, it follows logically from the notion of infinity which belongs to the First Cause of motion that no corporeal thing can be infinite itself; nor can infinite force be attributed to it. But the Prime Mover is infinite; for, since it itself is without motion, its force also remains unaffected by the motion of change and transformation. Therefore, the Prime Mover—that is, God—cannot be corporeal.

But as a being of necessary existence, God must also be absolutely simple and single; inasmuch as the conception of a plurality in its essence would, at the same time, nullify the notion of the necessity of Its existence. For the consolidation of this plurality into a unity must have been effected by another being different from itself; hence the existence of this plural being would be no more necessary, that is, determined by its own essence, but would be dependent upon that other being which brought about the unification.

From the notion of absolute unity results the conception of the uniqueness of God; for if two beings of this kind could exist, the unity of God would be nullified, since to one, at least, of the units a special character must be attributed so as to distinguish it from the other. With the doctrine of the unity of God is connected the doctrine of the divine attributes, which is preceded in Abraham ibn Daud's system by the doctrine of the negative attributes, already accepted by Bahya ibn Paquda. and by Judah ha-Levi from the older Arabic theology. According to Ibn Daud, only negative attributes, in the strict and proper sense, can be imputed to God; so that, whatever multiplicity of these negative attributes may be ascribed to It, no multiplicity in the essence of God can result. Certainly this is equivalent to a renunciation of a positive conception of the Divine Being; for negative statements may suffice to prevent erroneous ideas, but a positive knowledge can never be obtained through them alone. Indeed, our whole knowledge of God is limited to two certainties, (1) that It exists and (2) that Its essence is incomprehensible. In addition to the negative attributes, only relative attributes can be predicated of God; for even these latter, however many may be assumed, since they do not apply to the essence of God but only to Its relation to the world, produce no modification in the notion of the unity of the Divine Being.

From the speculative doctrines of faith, the truth of which can be proved only by reasoning, are to be distinguished the historical dogmas whose authenticity is based principally upon divine revelation, or (more precisely) upon the historical tradition of such a revelation. The tradition concerning an event that is reported to have taken place publicly before a great body of men, which originated, so to say, under the control of public opinion, without having been disputed by contemporaries, and has descended with an uninterrupted continuity, is persuasive which cannot be controverted even by the professional logician. The trustworthiness of historical tradition forms a presumption in favour of the truth of prophecy. This trust only applies when the divine revelations apply to important public matters, but not when they relate to less important matters, or to the personal affairs of a single individual. Thus, as ibn Daud remarks (perhaps referring to the miracles attributed to Jesus), the authenticity of the Torah would be in a difficult situation if, instead of being based historically certain miracles such as those of Moses, it were supported only by private miracles such as the resurrections by Elijah and Elisha.

=== Theory of prophecy ===
Relying upon the doctrines of Alfarabi and Avicenna, Ibn Daud (whom Maimonides follows in many ways in his conception of prophecy) further argues that the gift of prophecy must not be considered as a phenomenon, interrupting the continuity of the development of the human mind, but in a certain sense as the final stage of a natural evolution whose lower phases, though they must be distinguished from prophecy proper, are nevertheless connected with the same faculty through a certain identity of nature. And even if the true stage of prophecy is reached, this gift is, nevertheless, still capable of progressive development, although it may exceptionally at once reach the highest perfection in particularly gifted individuals.

The connection between the mind of the prophet and the higher intellects, principally with the Active Intelligence, furnishes a sufficient explanation of the higher cognitive faculty of the prophet, as well as of his power of transcending natural law. Appointed to become an intermediary between God and man, the prophet is elevated almost to the plane of the separated intelligences, or angels.

=== On predestination ===
Based upon the philosophical system developed above, and after the exposition of the doctrine of faith, the problem of human free will and its relation to faith in a divine providence, or predestination, may be regarded as much nearer its solution. The objection that faith in a divine providence is inconsistent with the existence of evil in the world, because God can not be the author of evil and good at the same time, is refuted by the fact that evil has no existence in itself, but is only the natural result of the absence of actual good, and that, consequently, evil needs no creator. The defects and imperfections which appear in this world in no way contradict the wisdom and goodness of God. The defects appear only to a finite conception which considers things separately and in themselves, and not in their connection with the whole. Viewed from a higher standpoint the imperfections adhering to things or individuals would perhaps, in their relation to the whole, even prove to be perfections and advantages.

The human free-will as a subjective principle has for its objective correlate the notion of possibility, by which one of two alternatives may occur. This does not limit divine omniscience in any way; unless, misled by common usage, one should designate as "possible" those things whose undetermined state results not from their own essence, but only from our deficient knowledge of the essence. But this kind of possibility, which, indeed, is no possibility at all, must be eliminated from God as quite irreconcilable with His omniscience. In its strict and precise form, the notion of possibility is not at all antagonistic to the omniscience of God; for it is easily conceivable that God from the beginning regulated creation, so that for certain cases both alternatives should be "possible" events; that the Creator, in order to grant to human liberty the opportunity to display its own energy, left the final issue of certain actions undecided even for His own knowledge.

Ibn Daud admits that human free will is somewhat limited through the variety of moral dispositions, partly due to natural causes, to be found both in single individuals and in entire nations. But man is able to overcome his natural disposition and appetites, and to lift himself to a higher plane of morality, by purifying and ennobling himself. The Torah, and the study of ethics which forms a part of practical philosophy and is designated, by an expression borrowed from Plato, as the "doctrine of the healing of souls," are the guiding stars to this exalted plane; but no scientific presentation of practical philosophy approaches in this regard the lofty heights of the Scriptures, wherein are clearly expressed the most sublime moral principles known to philosophers.

The ceremonial laws also serve the purpose of moral education. Therefore, they too qualify as moral laws; although when compared with the doctrines of faith and the ethical laws proper, they have only a subordinate importance, just as the Bible also attribute to the sacrifices a relatively minor importance in comparison with the moral laws.

== See also ==
- Latin translations of the 12th century

== Bibliography ==
- It has the following bibliography:
- Cohen, Gerson D. (1967). A Critical Edition with a Translation and Notes of "The Book of Tradition" (Sefer Ha-Qabbalah) by Abraham ibn Daud. Philadelphia: The Jewish Publication Society of America.
- Bages, Jaime (1972). Séfer ha-Kabbaláh (Libro de la Tradición). Valencia: Anubar Ediciones.
- Sefer ha-Kabbalah, with Latin translation by Gilbert Génébrard, Mantua, 1519, Paris, 1572, Cracow, 1820;
- Alfred Neubauer, Mediæval Jew. Chron., i;
- Emunah Ramah, German translation by S. Weil, Frankfort, 1882;
- Joseph Guggenheimer, Die Religionsphilosophie des Abraham ben David, Augsburg, 1850;
- J. Guttmann, Die Religionsphilosophie des Abraham ibn Daud aus Toledo, Göttingen, 1879.
