= Hebrew astronomy =

Astronomy written in Hebrew or by Hebrew speakers

Hebrew astronomy is any astronomy written in Hebrew or by Hebrew speakers, or translated into Hebrew, or written by Jews in Judeo-Arabic. It includes a range of genres from the earliest astronomy and cosmology contained in the Bible, mainly the Tanakh (Hebrew Bible or "Old Testament"), to Jewish religious works like the Talmud and very technical works.

Some Persian and Arabian traditions ascribe the invention of astronomy to Adam, Seth and Enoch. Some scholars suggest that the signs of the zodiac, or Mazzaroth, and the names of the stars associated with them originally were created as a mnemonic device by these forefathers of the Hebrews to tell the story of the Bible.

Historian Flavius Josephus says Seth and his offspring preserved ancient astronomical knowledge in pillars of stone.

== In the Bible ==
Only a few stars and constellations are named individually in the Hebrew Bible, and their identification is not certain. The clearest references include:

- Kesil (Biblical Hebrew: כְּסִיל, romanized: Kəsil), usually understood to be Orion, a giant angel.
- Kimā (כִימָה), which may be the Pleiades, Aldebaran, Arcturus, or Sirius.
- ʿĀš or ʿĀyiš (עָשׁ), possibly the Hyades, Arcturus or Ursa Major, or even the Evening Star.
- Mezarim (מְזָרִים Məzārim), which may be Ursa Major and Ursa Minor, or a synonym for mazzarot, in which case it would refer to the planets or the constellations of the zodiac.

Aside from the Earth, only two planets are named in the Hebrew Bible:

- The phrase "Sikkuth and Kiyyun" in Amos 5:26 refers to the Assyrian Sakkut and Kayawanu, names for Adar, representing Saturn.
- Venus, called the Queen of Heaven in Jeremiah 7:18 and elsewhere. That the latter means Venus is shown by the cakes, which are said to have been baked for her. In Assyria and Babylonia, the cake offerings were called "the bread of Ishtar". Hēlēl (הֵילֵל), the "son of the morning" (בֶּן שָׁחַר Ben-Šāḥar) in Isaiah 14:12, is also thought to be the Morning Star (Venus when visible before dawn). This identification is better known to many English speakers as its Latin name, Lucifer, the "light-bearer".

== In the Talmud ==
The information preserved in the Talmud does not emanate from one homogeneous system, as they are the accumulations of at least four centuries, and are traceable to various authors in the Jerusalem and Babylonian Talmuds, among whom many were inclined to mysticism.

=== Astronomy as a religious study ===
The high value of astronomical knowledge is already demonstrated by the astronomical section of the Book of Enoch (about 72–80 BC), as well as by such sayings as those of Eleazar Hisma (about 100), a profound mathematician, who could "count the drops in the ocean", and who declared that the "ability to compute the solstice and the calendar is the 'dessert' [auxiliaries] of wisdom. Among the sciences that Johanan ben Zakkai mastered was a knowledge of the solstices and the calendar; i.e., the ability to compute the course of the Sun and the Moon. Later writers declare that "to him who can compute the course of the sun and the revolution of the planets and neglects to do so, may be applied the words of the prophet, 'They regard not the work of the Lord, nor consider the operation of His hands.'" To pay attention to the course of the Sun and to the revolution of the planets is a religious injunction; for such is the import of the words, "This is your wisdom and your understanding in the sight of the nations".

Despite the general importance and religious significance attached to astronomy in the Holy Land, no notable developments in astronomy happened there during the Talmudic period. The starry heavens of the land of Israel interested the Jews as creations of God and as means to determine the holidays, but for a better knowledge of them the Jews were undoubtedly indebted to the Babylonians and their Hellenic pupils, as evidenced by the foreign term gematria used to designate the computation of the calendar. Probably this word represents a transposition of the Greek γραμματεία meaning "arithmetic, mathematics". Most of the observations of a scientific nature were transmitted by Samuel of Nehardea, who attended the schools of the Babylonians, and who claimed to possess as exact a knowledge of the heavenly regions as of the streets of Nehardea. Certain rules must nevertheless have existed, because Rabban Gamaliel (about 100), who applied the lunar tablets and telescope, relied for authority upon such as had been transmitted by his paternal ancestors.

=== Correspondence between Biblical numbers and astronomy ===
The number seven is a recurring numerical theme in the scriptures. The Temple menorah's seven lamps on four branches correspond to the lights of the seven classical planets: the Moon, Mercury, Venus, the Sun, Mars, Jupiter, and Saturn. Jewish mysticism recognized their great importance. Therefore, along with the four lunar phases being slightly over seven days (~7.4 days) each, the number 7 was held in very high regard. The Torah reflects this, as the beginning of the Genesis creation narrative, Genesis 1:1, has seven words and twenty-eight letters (7x4) in the Hebrew. In Genesis 1:14, it states, "And God said, 'Let there be lights in the heavens to separate the day from the night, and let them serve as signs to mark seasons, days, years and festivals'...the 4th day (of 7)."

Scholars identify the twelve signs of the zodiac with the Twelve Tribes of Israel.

=== Conceptions of the Heavens and Earth ===
In the Talmud, as in the Bible, the heavens and the Earth designate the two borders of the universe, with the heavens a covering over the Earth. One tannaitic authority believed that the sphere consists of a strong and firm plate two or three fingers in thickness, always lustrous and never tarnishing, another estimates the diameter of this plate as one-sixth of the Sun's diurnal journey, while another, a Babylonian, estimates it at 1,000 parasangs (approx. 3728 miles). Yet another authority states that the diameter of the firmament is equal to the distance covered in 50 or 500 years and this is true also of the Earth and the large sea (Tehom) upon which it rests.

The distance of the firmament from the Earth is a journey of 500 years, a distance equivalent to the diameter of the firmament, through which the Sun must saw its way in order to become visible. The firmament, according to some, consists of fire and water, and, according to others, of water only, while the stars consist of fire. East and West are at least as far removed from each other as is the firmament from the Earth. Heaven and Earth "kiss each other" at the horizon and between the water above and that below there are but two or three fingerbreadths. The Earth rests upon water and is encompassed by it.

According to other conceptions the Earth is supported by one, seven, or twelve pillars. These rest upon water, the water upon mountains, the mountains upon the wind, and the wind upon the storm, though this could easily be metaphoric. There is also mentioned the terrestrial globe, kaddur.

=== Chronology and the Mazzaroth ===
Chronology was a chief consideration in the study of astronomy among the Jews; sacred time was based upon the cycles of the Sun and the Moon. The Talmud identified the twelve constellations of the Mazzaroth (zodiac) with the twelve months of the Hebrew calendar. The correspondence of the constellations with their names in Hebrew and the months is as follows:

1. Aries - Ṭ'leh - Nisan
2. Taurus - Shor - Iyar
3. Gemini - Teomim - Sivan
4. Cancer - Sarṭan - Tammuz
5. Leo - Ari - Av
6. Virgo - Betulah - Elul
7. Libra - Moznayim - Tishrei
8. Scorpio - 'Aḳrab - Cheshvan
9. Sagittarius - Ḳeshet - Kislev
10. Capricorn - Gedi - Tevet
11. Aquarius - D'li - Shevat
12. Pisces - Dagim - Adar

The first three are in the east, the second three in the south, the third three in the west, and the last three in the north; and all are attendant on the Sun. According to one account, in the first three months (spring) the Sun travels in the south, in order to melt the snow; in the fourth through sixth months (summer) it travels directly above the Earth, in order to ripen the fruit; in the seventh through ninth months (autumn) it travels above the sea, in order to absorb the waters; and in the last three months (winter) it travels over the desert, in order that the grain may not dry up and wither.

According to one conception, Aries, Leo, and Sagittarius face northward; Taurus, Virgo, and Capricornus westward; Gemini, Libra, and Aquarius southward; and Cancer, Scorpio, and Pisces eastward. Some scholars identified the twelve signs of the zodiac with the twelve tribes of Israel.

The four solstices (the Tekufot of Nisan, Tammuz, Tishrei, and Tevet) are often mentioned as determining the seasons of the year and there are occasional references to the rising-place of the Sun. Sometimes six seasons of the year are mentioned, and reference is often made to the receptacle of the Sun (ναρθήκιον), by means of which the heat of the orb is mitigated. The Moon was also a part of the calendar: "The moon begins to shine on the 1st of the month; its light increases until the 15th, when the disk [דסקוס (δίσκοσ)] is full; from the 15th to the 30th it wanes; and on the 30th it is invisible."

=== The heavenly bodies and their motions ===
Two different cosmologies can be found in the Talmud. One is a flat Earth cosmology resembling descriptions of the world in the mythology of the Ancient Near East. The other, is a geocentric model, according to which the stars move about the earth. According to Aristotle, Ptolemy, and other philosophers among the Greeks, the stars have no motion of their own, being firmly attached to spheres whose center is the Earth. A passage in the Talmud contrasts the pagan view with that of Jewish sages:

The learned of Israel say, "The sphere stands firm, and the planets revolve"; the learned of the nations say, "The sphere moves, and the planets stand firm." The learned of Israel say, "The sun moves by day beneath the firmament, and by night above the firmament"; the learned of the nations say, "The sun moves by day beneath the firmament, and by night beneath the earth."

The Sun has 365 windows through which it emerges: 182 in the east, 182 in the west, and 1 in the middle, the place of its first entrance. The course described by it in a year is traversed by the Moon in 30 days. The solar year is longer by 11 days than the lunar year. The Sun completes its course in 12 months; Jupiter, in 12 years; Saturn, in 30 years; Venus and Mars, in 480 years; however, an objection is raised here (in a gloss) against the last-mentioned number. King Antoninus asked the patriarch why the Sun rises in the east and sets in the west. At the time of the Genesis flood narrative, it travelled in the opposite direction. Every 28 years it returns to its original point of departure, and on Tuesday evening of the spring solstice it is in opposition with Saturn, although Plato maintained that the Sun and planets never return to the place whence they started. This is a 28-year cycle. The Moon cycle of 19 years may have been meant in Targum Pseudo-Jonathan, Genesis 1:14.

The names of the five planets, one star and one moon [planetary satellite] are:

- Shabbatay שבתאי, Saturn
  - Meaning: "of Shabbat"
- Tzedeq צדק, Jupiter
  - Meaning: "righteousness"
- Ma'adim מאדים, Mars
  - Meaning: "the red one"
- Ḥamma חמה, the Sun
  - Meaning: "the hot one"
- Kokhevet כוכבת, Noga נוגה or Kokhav-Noga כוכב נוגה, Venus
  - Meanings: "the she-planet", "the bright one", or "the bright planet", respectively
- Kokhav כוכב, Mercury
  - Meaning: "the star"
- Levanah לבנה, the Moon
  - Meaning: "the white one"

In many languages, the names of the days of the week are derived from the names of the seven planets; each day was consecrated to the particular planet that ruled during the early hours of the morning. While Talmudists were familiar with the planets and their characteristics in astrology, they opposed their worship; therefore, weekdays are not named in Hebrew, except for Shabbat. Instead, they are referred to by number.

=== Fixed stars and comets ===
The Milky Way is called "Fire-Stream", a name borrowed from Daniel 7:10 (Nehar di-nur), where it may possibly have had the same signification. The statement is also made that the sting of Scorpio may be seen lying in the Milky Way. Samuel said: "We have it as a tradition that no comet ever passed across the face of Orion "Kesil"; for if this should happen the earth would be destroyed." When his hearers objected to this statement, saying, "Yet we see that this occurs," Samuel replied: "It only appears so; for the comet passes either above or below the star. Possibly also its radiance passes, but not its body." Again, Samuel says: "But for the warmth of Orion, the earth could not exist, because of the frigidity of Scorpio; furthermore, Orion lies near Taurus, with which the warm season begins. The comet, because of its tail, is called kokba de-shabbiṭ. (rodstar). Rabbi Joshua ben Hananiah (about 100), declared that a star appears once every seventy years and leads mariners astray, hence they should at such time lay in a larger store of provisions. Rapoport endeavors to prove that the path of Halley's Comet had been computed by a wise rabbi. Samuel said: "I know all the paths of heaven, but nothing of the nature of the comet."

The following Biblical names of constellations are mentioned and explained: כימה = כמאה. Pleiades (Biblically known as the Seven Stars) [a cluster of] about a hundred stars, and for the much disputed עש, its equally obscure Aramaic equivalent יותא (MS. M. אתא), Syriac עיותא, is given.

== Post-Talmudic times ==
With the revival of Hellenistic astronomy which took place during the Islamic Golden Age, Jews were intimately connected, and the Almagest is said to have been translated by Sahal ibn Tabari as early as AD 800, while one of the earliest independent students of astronomy among the Arabs was Mashallah ibn Athari (754-873?). Jews seem to have been particularly concerned with the formation of astronomical tables of practical utility to astronomers. Sind ben Ali (about 830) was one of the principal contributors to the tables drawn up under the patronage of the Caliph al-Mamun. No less than twelve Jews were concerned in the Tables of Toledo, drawn up about AD 1080 under the influence of Ahmad ibn Zaid, and the celebrated Alfonsine Tables were executed under the superintendence of Isaac ibn Sid, while Jews were equally concerned in the less-known tables of Peter IV of Aragon.

Isaac al-Ḥadib compiled astronomical tables from those of Al-Rakkam, Al-Battam, and Ibn al-Kammad. Joseph ibn Wakkar (1357) drew up tables of the period 720 (Heg.); while Mordecai Comtino and Mattathia Delacrut commented upon the Persian and Paris tables respectively; the latter were commented upon also by Farissol Botarel. Abraham ibn Ezra translated Al-Mattani's Canons of the Khwarizmi Tables, and in his introduction tells a remarkable story of a Jew in India who helped Jacob ben Tarik to translate the Indian astronomical tables according to the Indian cycle of 432,000 years. Other tables were compiled by Jacob ben Makir, Emanuel ben Jacob, Jacob ben David ben Yom-Ṭob Poel (1361), Solomon ben Elijah (from the Persian tables), and Abraham Zacuto of Salamanca (about 1515).

The earliest to treatise of astronomy in Hebrew on a systematic plan was Abraham bar Ḥiyya, who wrote at Marseilles, about AD 1134. Discussions on astronomical points, especially with regard to the spheres, and disputed points in calculating the calendar occur frequently in the works of Judah ha-Levi, Abraham ibn Ezra, and Maimonides, while a new system of astronomy is contained in the "Wars of the Lord" ("Milḥamot Adonai") of Levi ben Gershon.

Jews were especially involved as translators. Moses ibn Tibbon translated from the Arabic Jabir ben Aflah's acute criticisms of the Ptolemaic system, an anticipation of Copernicus, and thus brought them to the notice of Maimonides. Ibn al-Haitham's Arabic compendium of astronomy was a particular favorite of Jewish astronomers; besides being translated into Spanish by Don Abraham Faquin, it was turned into Hebrew by Jacob ben Makir and Solomon ibn Pater Cohen and into Latin by Abraham de Balmes. Other translations from the Arabic were by Jacob Anatoli, Moses Galeno, and Kalonymus ben Kalonymus, bringing the Greco-Arabic astronomers to the notice of western Europe. Jacob Anatoli, for example, translated into Hebrew both the Almagest and Averroes' compendium of it, and this Hebrew version was itself translated into Latin by Jacob Christmann. Other translators from the Hebrew into Latin were Abraham de Balmes and Kalonymus ben David of Naples, while David Kalonymus ben Jacob, Ephraim Mizraḥi, and Solomon Abigdor translated from the Latin into Hebrew. The well-known family of translators, the Ibn Tibbons, may be especially mentioned. In practical astronomy Jewish work was even more effective. Jacob ben Makir (who is known also as Profiat Tibbon) appears to have been professor of astronomy at Montpellier, about 1300, and to have invented a quadrant to serve as a substitute for the astrolabe. Levi ben Gershon was also the inventor of an astronomical instrument, and is often quoted with respect under the name of Leon de Bañolas. Bonet de Lattes also invented an astronomical ring. Abraham Zacuto ben Samuel was professor of astronomy at Salamanca, and afterward astronomer-royal to Emmanuel of Portugal, who had previously been advised by a Jewish astronomer, Rabbi Joseph Vecinho, a pupil of Abraham Zacuto, as to the project put before him by Christopher Columbus, who, in carrying it out, made use of Zacuto's "Almanac" and "Tables".

With the Renaissance, Jewish work in astronomy lost in importance, as Europe could refer to the Greek astronomers without it. The chief name connected with of astronomical studies in this period is that of David Gans of Prague (d. 1613), who corresponded with Kepler and Tycho Brahe. He was acquainted with the Copernican system, but preferred that of Ptolemy, while as late as 1714 David Nieto of London still stood out against the Copernican system.

Other Jewish astronomers of note are H. Goldschmidt (1802–1866), who discovered 14 asteroids. Wilhelm Beer (1797–1850), the brother of Meyer Beer, drew one of the most accurate maps of the moon of his time. Moritz Loewy (b. 1833) was director of the Paris Observatory, and the inventor of the coudé or elbow telescope, by which the stars may be observed without bending the neck back and without leaving the comfortable observatory.

Rahab is the official Hebrew name for the planet Neptune in a vote organised by the Academy of the Hebrew Language in 2009.

== See also ==
- Abraham bar Hiyya Ha-Nasi (1130)
- Abraham ibn Ezra (1093–1168)
- Abraham Zacuto ben Samuel (1452 – probably 1515)
- Babylonian astronomy
- David Gans (died 1613)
- Elijah Mizrachi (died 1526)
- Genesis creation narrative
- Gersonides (Levi ben Gershon), (1327–1344)
- Isaac Israeli ben Joseph (1310–1330)
- Islamic astronomy
- Jacob Anatoli (1232)
- Jewish views of astrology
- Judah ha-Levi (1140)
- Kabbalistic astrology
  - Sefer Raziel HaMalakh
  - Sefer Yetzirah
- Mashallah ibn Athari (754–813)
- Moses ibn Tibbon (fl. 1244–1274)
- Moses Isserles (d. 1573)
