= Jewish views on astrology =

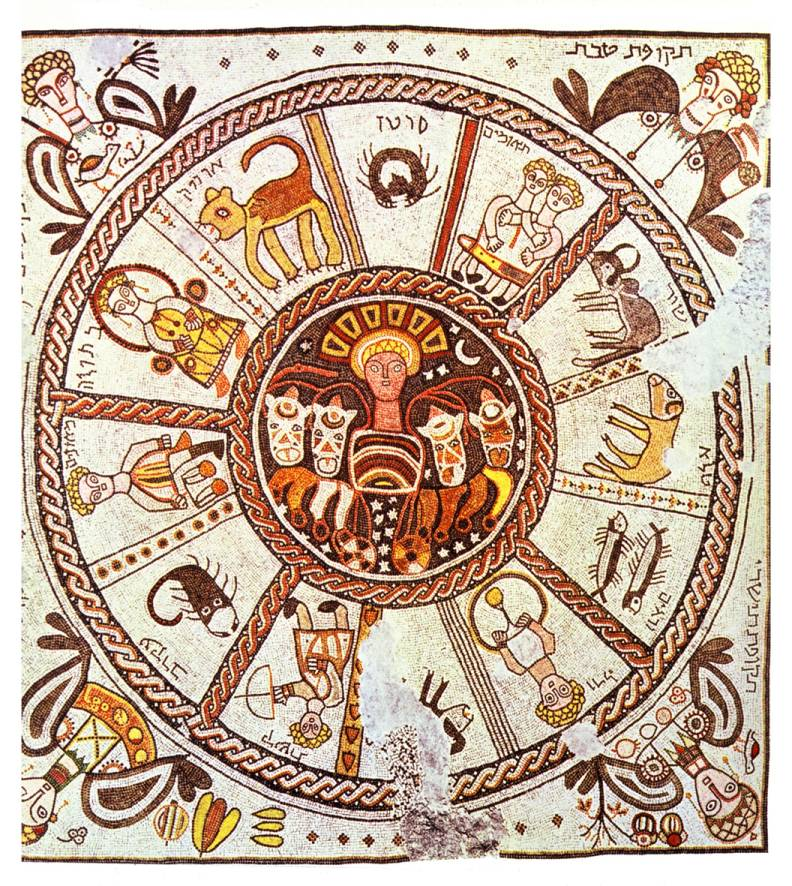
ancient synagogal zodiac, 6th-century Palestinian synagogue of Beth Alpha, now in Israel.

Astrology has been a topic of debate among Jews for over 2000 years. While not a Jewish practice or teaching as such, astrology made its way into Jewish thought, as evidenced by the many references to it in the Talmud. Astrological statements became accepted and worthy of debate and discussion by Torah scholars. Opinions varied: many accepted its validity and considered its practice meaningful and a mitzvah, while other rabbis rejected astrology's validity.

Genesis 1:14	God said, "Let there be lights in the expanse of Heaven to divide the day from the night; and let them be signs for the seasons, and for days and years.

In the modern era, many Jewish institutional scholars favor scientific ideas over archaic religious ones that conflict with scientific ideas such as astrology. Many devout religious Jews outside of secular academia advance pro-astrology views that were unrivaled in premodern times.

In premodern periods, astrology was known as ḥakhemat ham-mazzalot (Hebrew: חָכְמַת הַמַּזָּלוֹת, romanized: ḥāk̲əmat̲ hammazzāloṯ), "the science of the constellations".

== Archaeology ==
There are numerous remarkably well-preserved zodiac mosaics in ancient synagogues from the late pre-Christian to early Christian era, either as part of greater tableaux as at Beth Alpha, or alone. The layout is such: a solar deity, presumed to be Helios rather than Shamash, surrounded by the twelve signs on a roundel, cornered into a square by the four seasons.

== In the Hebrew Bible ==
Astrology is sometimes with astrolatry, which is explicitly forbidden in the Torah. The late Rabbi Joel C. Dobin wrote an apology for Ancient Israelite astrology, proving its integration into prose and poetic content of the Hebrew Bible.

Astrology was an integral feature of Israelite society. Josephus addresses Israelite astrology by the following remarks: [14] Ἀλλὰ μὴν καὶ τοὺς περὶ τῶν οὐρανίων τε καὶ θείων πρώτους παρ' Ἕλλησι φιλοσοφήσαντας, οἷον Φερεκύδην τε τὸν Σύριον καὶ Πυθαγόραν καὶ Θάλητα, πάντες συμφώνως ὁμολογοῦσιν Αἰγυπτίων καὶ Χαλδαίων γενομένους μαθητὰς ὀλίγα συγγράψαι, καὶ ταῦτα τοῖς Ἕλλησιν

Translation [14] But of those among them who first introduced concerning celestial and Gods, and Greek philosophy such as Pherkydes the Syrian and Pythagoras and Thales, it is generally agreed that whatever they knew was learned from the Egyptians and Chaldeans; what little these wrote is reckoned to be the oldest of all writings among the Greeks;

[217] Ἐνέφαινον δ' οἱ μὲν ἑπτὰ λύχνοι τοὺς πλανήτας: τοσοῦτοι γὰρ ἀπ' αὐτῆς διῄρηντο τῆς λυχνίας: οἱ δὲ ἐπὶ τῆς τραπέζης ἄρτοι δώδεκα τὸν ζῳδιακὸν κύκλον καὶ τὸν ἐνιαυτόν.

Translation 217 The seven lamps, for such were the branches rising from the candlestick, meant the seven planets, and the twelve loaves upon the table meant the circle of the zodiac and the year.

In the Book of Judges 5:20 the Stars are described as supporting a favorable outcome for Israel.

מן־שׁמים נלחמוּ הכּוכבים ממּסלּותם נלחמוּ עם־סיסרא׃
שופטים
5:20 Westminster Leningrad Codex

From the sky the stars fought, From their courses they fought against Sisera. Judges 5:20 Hebrew Names Version

The Israelites were not detached from celestial activities as anti-astrology people allege. The celestial bodies also are mentioned as giving praise to The Most High in Psalm 148.

Psalmi 148:1-4

Psalmi 148

- Psa 148:1 WLC -
  הללוּ יהּ הללוּ את־יהוה מן־השּׁמים הללוּהוּ בּמּרומים׃

Praise YHWH! Praise YHWH from the heavens! Praise Him in the heights! - Psa 148:1 HNV

- Psa 148:2 WLC -
  הללוּהוּ כל־מלאכיו הללוּהוּ כּל־צבאיו׃

Praise Him, all His angels! Praise Him, all His host! - Psa 148:2 HNV

- Psa 148:3 WLC -
  הללוּהוּ שׁמשׁ וירח הללוּהוּ כּל־כּוכבי אור׃

Praise Him, Sun and Moon! Praise Him, all you shining Stars! - Psa 148:3 HNV

- Psa 148:4 WLC -
  הללוּהוּ שׁמי השּׁמים והמּים אשׁר מעל השּׁמים׃

Praise Him, you heavens of heavens, You waters that are above the heavens. - Psa 148:4 HNV

Psalm 19:1-6

[1] לַמְנַצֵּ֗חַ מִזְמ֥וֹר לְדָוִֽד׃

For the Chief Musician. A Psalm by David. - Psa 19:1 HNV

[2] הַשָּׁמַ֗יִם מְֽסַפְּרִ֥ים כְּבֽוֹד־אֵ֑ל וּֽמַעֲשֵׂ֥ה יָ֝דָ֗יו מַגִּ֥יד הָרָקִֽיעַ׃

The heavens declare the glory of God. The expanse shows his handiwork. - Psa 19:2 HNV

[3] י֣וֹם לְ֭יוֹם יַבִּ֣יעַֽ אֹ֑מֶר וְלַ֥יְלָה לְּ֝לַ֗יְלָה יְחַוֶּה־דָּֽעַת׃

Day after day they pour forth speech, And night after night they display knowledge. - Psa 19:3 HNV

[4] אֵֽין־אֹ֭מֶר וְאֵ֣ין דְּבָרִ֑ים בְּ֝לִ֗י נִשְׁמָ֥ע קוֹלָֽם׃

There is no speech nor language, Where their voice is not heard. Psa 19:4 HNV

[5] בְּכָל־הָאָ֨רֶץ ׀ יָ֘צָ֤א קַוָּ֗ם וּבִקְצֵ֣ה תֵ֭בֵל מִלֵּיהֶ֑ם לַ֝שֶּׁ֗מֶשׁ שָֽׂם־אֹ֥הֶל בָּהֶֽם׃

Their voice has gone out through all the eretz, Their words to the end of the world. In them he has set a tent for the sun, - Psa 19:5 HNV

[6] :וְה֗וּא כְּ֭חָתָן יֹצֵ֣א מֵחֻפָּת֑וֹ יָשִׂ֥ישׂ כְּ֝גִבּ֗וֹר לָר֥וּץ אֹֽרַח

Which is as a bridegroom coming out of his chamber, Like a strong man rejoicing to run his course. - Psa 19:6 HNV

[7] מִקְצֵ֤ה הַשָּׁמַ֨יִם ׀ מֽוֹצָא֗וֹ וּתְקוּפָת֥וֹ עַל־קְצוֹתָ֑ם וְאֵ֥ין נִ֝סְתָּ֗ר מֵֽחַמָּתוֹ׃

His going forth is from the end of the heavens, His circuit to its ends; There is nothing hidden from its heat. - Psa 19:7 HNV

The Torah appears to contain no references to astrology, and in the Nevi'im (Prophets) and Ketuvim (Writings). Only obscure references to Babylonian astrologers exist.

עֹשֵׂ֨ה כִימָ֜ה וּכְסִ֗יל וְהֹפֵ֤ךְ לַבֹּ֨קֶר֙ צַלְמָ֔וֶת וְי֖וֹם לַ֣יְלָה הֶחְשִׁ֑יךְ הַקּוֹרֵ֣א לְמֵֽי־הַיָּ֗ם וַֽיִּשְׁפְּכֵ֛ם עַל־פְּנֵ֥י הָאָ֖רֶץ יְהוָ֥ה שְׁמֽוֹ׃ ס
עמוס 5:8

Seek Him who made the Peleides and Orion and turn the shadow of death into dawn, also the day night darkness who calls to the waters of the sea while they pour out upon the face of the land: YHWH is His name. Amos 5:8

Those who oppose astrology allege that astrology was forbidden through eisegetical methods. The opposition to astrology had its origins in the "Age of Reason" or "Enlightenment" which centered European patricians as the arbiters of knowledge. Science was the result of that so-called Enlightenment era. Since stars cannot be controlled by men, science replaced astrology with a subjective discipline: astronomy. Eventually alchemy was replaced with chemistry and biology. Physics was redesigned to feature their man-made "Laws of motion" and so on.

Many religious institutions in the modernist era forbade astrology from being referenced in biblical discourses. The following remarks are examples of such erroneous historical revisionism: As far as [it] can be known from the Bible, astrology was not practiced in ancient Israel during the First Temple period.

These commandments are understood by some rabbinic authorities as forbidding astrology, while others limit these mitzvot to other forms of esoteric practices, and thus view astrology as permissible.

The Hebrew word mazzalot, which literally means "constellations", is used twice in the Hebrew Bible. Specific constellations are also mentioned, such as Orion, named "Kesil" כסיל 'fool'; possibly etymologically connected with Kislev, the name for the ninth month of the Hebrew calendar, which, in turn, may derive from the Hebrew root K-S-L as in the words "kesel, kisla" (כֵּסֶל, כִּסְלָה, hope, positiveness), that is, hope for winter rains. It is mentioned three times: Job 9:9 ("He is the maker of the Bear and Orion"), Job 38:31 ("Can you loosen Orion's belt?"), and Amos 5:8 ("He who made the Pleiades and Orion").

The prophets were non-determinists with respect to star-gazers' inauspicious reports, e.g., in Isaiah 47:13 and Jeremiah 10:2. Astrologers from Mesopotamia were called Kasdim/Kasdin (Chaldeans) in the Book of Daniel. In rabbinic literature, the term Chaldeans later was often used as a synonym for astrologer.

== In the Second Temple period ==
For most of the Second Temple period, discussion of the planets in Jewish literature was extremely rare. Some historians hold that astrology slowly entered the Jewish community in the Hellenistic period. In prophesizing on the destruction of the Temple in 70 CE, the Sibylline Oracles praise Jewish ancestors who "have no concern about the course of the sun's revolution, nor the moon's [..] Nor soothsayers, nor wizards, nor enchanters [...] Neither do they astrologize with skill of the Chaldeans, nor astronomize; O For these are all deceptive"; although the author of the Encyclopaedia Judaica article on astrology holds that this view is mistaken.

The early historian Josephus censures the people for ignoring what he thought were signs foreshadowing the destruction of the Temple.

There are many references to astrology in the apocrypha. The Book of Jubilees said that Abraham overcame the beliefs of astrologers by accepting one God.

== In the Talmudic period ==
In early classical rabbinic works written in the land of Israel (Jerusalem Talmud and midrash compilations) astrologers are known as astrologos and astrologiyya. In early classical rabbinic works written in Babylonia, astrologers were called kaldiyyim, kalda'ei, and iztagninin.

=== Is astrology valid? ===
The most popular form of astrological belief in this period was to regard certain periods of time as lucky or unlucky. For example, Rabbi Yehoshua ben Levi listed the character traits associated with one's having been born on specific days of the week; R' Hanina dissented and said that character traits are determined by the planet under whose influence one was born. An announcement is found to the effect that it is dangerous to drink water on Tuesday and Friday evenings. Samuel of Nehardea, a physician and astrologer, taught that it was dangerous to bleed a patient on Tuesday (as well as on Monday or Thursday for a different reason), because Mars reigns at the midheaven. The new moon was likewise regarded as an unfavorable season for bleeding, as were also the third of the month and the day preceding a festival.

Ecclesiastes Rabbah states that the rulers of some non-Jewish nations were experts in astrology, and that King Solomon too had expertise in this realm.

In general, many people quoted in the Talmud believed that in theory astrology had merit as some kind of science, but they were skeptical that astrological signs could be interpreted correctly or in a practical fashion. In one place the Talmud states that astrologers "gaze and know not at what they gaze at, ponder and know not what they ponder."

According to Jacob Neusner, in this period "magic, astrology, and occult sciences... were regarded as advanced sciences... to reject them, the Jews and their leaders would have had to ignore the most sophisticated technological attainments of contemporary civilization."

=== Does astrology apply to Israel? ===
Some rabbis held that the stars generally do control the fate of people and nations, but Abraham and his descendants were elevated by their covenant with God, and thus achieve an elevated level of free will in Genesis Rabbah 44:12, Yal., Jer. 285.

In the Talmud, Johanan bar Nappaha and Abba Arikha held that "there is no mazzal (literally "constellation") for Israel, but only for the nations", while one held the contrary, that astrology does apply to Israel.

It is said that Abraham predicted via astrological tablets that he would have no second son, but God said to him, "Away with your astrology; for Israel there is no mazzal!" The birth of his second son, the patriarch Isaac, then disproves the idea that astrology applies to Israel. Genesis Rabbah states that Abraham was not an astrologer, but rather a prophet, inasmuch as only those beneath the stars could be subject to their influence, but that Abraham was above them.

=== Is it permitted for Jews to practice astrology? ===
Samuel of Nehardea is the only sage in the Talmud who seriously studied astrology, yet he held that it was not compatible with Judaism. Quoting Deuteronomy 30:12, "The Law is not in the Heavens", he is reputed to have taught that "Torah cannot go together with the art that studies the heavens".

Similarly, Jose of Hutzal prohibited consulting an astrologer: "We are not permitted to appeal to the Chaldeans, for it is written (Deuteronomy 18:13), 'You shall be perfect with the Lord your God'".

Several sources record that Rabbi Akiva prohibited the practice of astrology.

The biblical Patriarch Abraham is said to have known astrology, with many people congregated before him to seek advice. This may indicate a more positive attitude towards the practice of astrology.

== In the medieval era ==
Many rabbis in the Geonic era (after the close of the Talmud, early medieval period) discussed the varying Talmudic and midrashic views on astrology. One responsum takes a middle view: Otzar HaGeonim 113, concludes that astrology has some reality, in that the stars give a person certain inclinations; however each person has the ability to overcome their own inclinations, and thus maintains free will.

Astrology was practised by some Jews throughout the Middle Ages, both as a professional art and as a science. Coming from the East, Jews were sometimes looked upon as heirs and successors of the Chaldeans. For this reason, Jews sometimes were regarded by the Western world as masters of astrology. Their supposed power over destiny on occasion filled the multitudes with awe and fear.

Abraham ibn Ezra was a follower of astrology, which he calls "a sublime science." Besides translating another Jewish philosopher Mashallah's astrological work Questions and another work of this author on the eclipse of the moon from the Arabic into Hebrew, he wrote Nativity, Sentences of the Constellations, Reshit Hokhmah (Beginning of Wisdom), Book of the World, a treatise on the Planets, a treatise on the Luminaries, and a horoscope. He often refers to astrology in his Bible commentaries. To him heaven with its constellations is "the book of life," in which man's destiny is written, and against which there is recourse to God as "the Almighty," who overrules all these influences. A modern scholar summarizes Ibn Ezra's attitude as follows: "The deity has delegated to the stars the governance of the sublunar world. Israel [Jews], however, enjoys a special status, which is manifest most decisively in its possession of the Torah. As long as a Jew is engaged in the study and observance of the Torah, he is linked to a spiritual realm which is itself superior to the stars. In this way a Jew may liberate himself from the decrees of the stars."

Dunash ibn Tamim (850–956, North Africa), who wrote a commentary on the Kabbalistic work Sefer Yetzirah, wrote a treatise on astronomy which rejected astrology.

Abraham ben David of Posquières asserted the influence of the stars upon destiny, while also contending that by faith in God man may overcome this influence.

Gersonides believed that astrology was real, and developed a naturalistic, non-supernatural explanation of how it works. For Gersonides, astrology was:

founded on the metaphysical doctrine of the dependence of all earthly occurrences upon the heavenly world. The general connection imparted to the prophet by the active intellect is the general order of the astrological constellation. The constellation under which a man is born determines his nature and fate, and constellations as well determine the life span of nations....The active intellect knows the astrological order, from the most general form of the constellations to their last specification, which in turn contains all of the conditions of occurrence of a particular event. Thus, when a prophet deals with the destiny of a particular person or human group, he receives from the active intellect a knowledge of the order of the constellations, and with sufficient precision to enable him to predict its fate in full detail..... This astrological determinism has only one limitation. The free will of man could shatter the course of action ordained for him by the stars; prophecy could therefore predict the future on the basis of astrological determination only insofar as the free will of man does not break through the determined course of things.

Gersonides believed astrology to be a science that predicts events according to set laws of nature (albeit, a different set than the ones we are used to). He also believed that a person who has perfected his thinking could interact with the laws of nature through the active intellect. Gersonides thus thought of himself as creating a rationalist and non-supernatural theology. In this sense, there is a similarity between Gersonides and Maimonides.

Shlomo ibn Aderet—in a responsum commonly but mistakenly attributed to Nahmanides—wrote that while one may not ask an astrologer for a prediction, astrology itself is real. He states rules that one must ultimately trust in God, and not in any lesser force, as God can perform miracles to overcome the patterns of nature. As such, he concludes that one is forbidden to ask an astrologer for a prediction, but one may act on the words of an astrologer if advice is freely given.

Nahmanides himself wrote that astrology is a real facet of nature, which astrologers can interpret but not reliably; Jews are forbidden to use astrology and instead required to consult prophets, whose word is always reliable.

Maimonides answered an inquiry concerning astrology, addressed to him from Marseille. He responded that man should believe only what can be supported either by rational proof, by the evidence of the senses, or by trustworthy authority. He states that he has studied astrology and that it does not deserve to be described as a science. He ridicules the idea that a man's fate could depend on the constellations, arguing that such a theory would rob life of purpose and would make man a slave of destiny.

Isaac ben Joseph ibn Pulgar (14th century, Spain) was a Jewish philosopher who wrote against astrology.

The Arba'ah Turim, an early code of Jewish law, brings the views of Maimonides. Joseph Karo in his commentary "Beit Yosef" quotes Nahmanides, whereas in his code the Shulkhan Arukh, he rules that consulting an astrologer is forbidden, without addressing the question of whether astrology is effective.

== 18th century ==
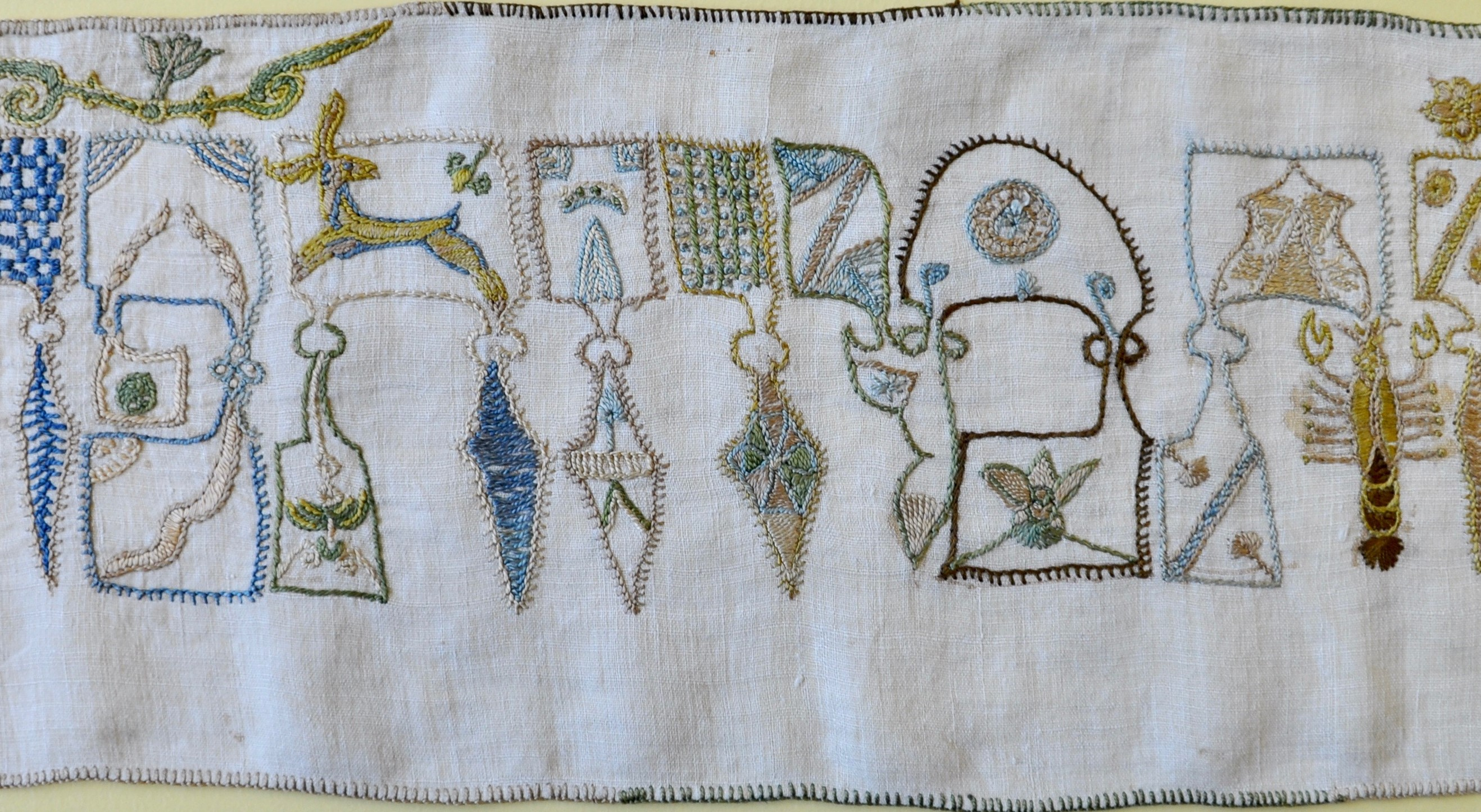
Lengnau wimpel from 1726 showing a finely embroidered scorpion, in the collection of the Jewish Museum of Switzerland.

=== Moshe Chaim Luzzatto ===
Moshe Chaim Luzzatto (1707–1746) discusses the influence of stars on humanity and events on earth. He gave two reasons for the existence of stars and planets. The first is that stars and planets maintain the existence of all physical things on earth, acting as the means by which spiritual forces are transmitted to physical entities. The second is that events on earth are also initiated through planetary and stellar activity. Luzzatto states that each earthly phenomenon is assigned to a specific star, which controls it. Quoting the Talmudic dictum in Shabbos 156a – "for Israel, there is no mazal ("luck", literally "planet" or "constellation")", he also states that higher powers (i.e. God or angels) may overcome the influences of this system, and that they typically do so for Jews.

Luzzatto notes that the laws and rules governing this system of astrological influence are extremely complex, and not easily ascertainable through direct observation; thus astrologers are rarely able to predict the future accurately or clearly. The accuracy of their predictions is further reduced by the aforementioned propensity of divine providence to intervene and override the system. This, Luzzatto states, explains the use of the word me'asher ("something") in Book of Isaiah ("Now let the astrologers, stargazers and fortunetellers stand up and tell you something about what will come upon you", Isaiah 47:13); in Luzzatto's view, this means they can tell you something about the future, but not everything.

== Modern era (19th-21st century) ==
Strictures against astrology appear in the official Torah commentary of Conservative Judaism and on the official website of Reform Judaism, and a number of Conservative and Reform rabbis have written against the practice. The opinions of contemporary Orthodox rabbis are divided; some reject astrology altogether, while others continue to follow pre-modern opinions that accept the validity of astrology but limit its practice.

Commenting on Deuteronomy 18:9–12, Etz Hayim, the official Torah commentary of Conservative Judaism writes "Hence the use of astrology is prohibited (BT Pesachim 113b)." Similarly, Conservative rabbi Simchah Roth commented negatively on astrology.

Conservative Rabbi Aaron Kriegel writes:

However, astrology is by and large nothing more than magic. The Torah is very clear that we are to steer clear of magicians and practitioners of "witchcraft." I'm not talking about the David Copperfield type of entertainment; I'm referring to those who believe that their predictions or tricks can have a real influence on the world, and by implication, can force God to give them what they want. The idea that if only we could say the right words or take the right actions, God will give us anything we want is nearly idolatrous. It turns God into nothing more than a tool for us to use when we want something, rather than the majestic creator of the world.

On the Union for Reform Judaism website Jeffrey K. Salkin derides astrology as "a new-age trap":

If you visit a Barnes and Noble superstore, you will see what much of American religion has become. There are three bookcases for Judaism; three bookcases for general religion and Christianity; three for general inspiration; two each for Bible, eastern philosophy, and myth; and nine bookcases for New Age. The New Age menu is diverse, including spiritualism, astrology, and psychic phenomena; alchemy, tarot, goddess worship, and Wicca (witchcraft); out-of-body experiences, near-death experiences, and reincarnation: angels, Satanism, and the occult ...

Modern Orthodox rabbis have written against the practice as well, some seeing it as forbidden by Jewish law. For instance, Modern Orthodox Rabbi Ephraim Buchwald writes:

The Torah tells us in Deuteronomy 18:9, that when the Jewish people enter the land of Israel, they must not follow the abominable practices of the nations that reside there. It is strictly prohibited to cause a son or a daughter to pass through the fire, to practice divination, astrology, or to visit one who reads omens. ... to follow these practices is an abomination in God's eyes. It is quite extraordinary that Maimonides ... virtually alone in the Middle Ages, rejected belief in astrology. In a letter to the rabbis of Southern France he distinguishes between astronomy as a true science and astrology which he deems to be sheer superstition. Many hundreds of years passed until the Western world came to the same conclusion. Maimonides boldly declares that in Judaism a person's fate is determined by God alone, not by the stars.

The Chief Rabbi of the United Kingdom (Orthodox) Jonathan Sacks, writes:

Wrestling with men: since the days of Abraham, to be a Jew is to be an iconoclast. We challenge the idols of the age, whatever the idols, whatever the age. Sometimes it meant wrestling with idolatry, superstition, paganism, magic, astrology, primitive beliefs.

Modern Orthodox Rabbi Nachum Amsel writes:

It seems that most of the authorities believe that astrology has some sort of power, but there is a fine line between believing in this and believing in power other than God, which is not the Jewish view. Thus, one cannot give credence to any power except God nor use astrology on a regular basis to guide one's life.

An article published by the Orthodox Union takes a different approach:

In Judaism, Astrology is not regarded as "idol worship," even though the generic name for "idol worship" is "Avodat Kochavim U'Mazalot," Worship of the Stars and the Signs of the Zodiac." From the Jewish perspective, the stars are not unrelated to events on earth. It is not irrelevant whether one was born on Pesach, or Yom Kippur, or Lag Ba'Omer or on any particular day. Each day is special and has a unique imprint. On the other hand, if an individual was born under the "sign" of Mars, the Talmud says that he will have a tendency to spill blood. This tendency can be realized in a number of very different ways, however, which are subject to an individual's choice. In this case, options might be a soldier, a surgeon, a murderer, a "shochet," a ritual slaughterer of animals, or a "mohel," one who performs ritual circumcisions. These options correspond to a potential hero, a healer, one who violates the "image of G-d," to those who do "holy work" of different types. There is a principle, "Ayn Mazal L'Yisrael," "Israel's fate is not determined by the stars." The Jew, raised in his People's traditions and Torah values, feels the reality of "freedom of choice" in his bones. So deeply ingrained is this knowledge and feeling, that the Jew rarely has cause to think about astrological factors.

It is the belief that one cannot escape from the grip of the stars that distinguishes Astrology from "Worship of the Stars and Signs of the Zodiac." It is always possible to define one's fate, by choosing behavior which is guided by morality and integrity, within the parameters – intellectual and emotional, physical and spiritual, which a person is given to work with.

Aryeh Kaplan, known for his rationalist synthesis of modern scientific thinking and Kabbalah, and creator of a modern translation of Derekh Hashem, echoes the viewpoint of its author (Moshe Chaim Luzzatto) on astrology. In his translation of and commentary on Sefer Yetzirah, Kaplan writes:

In order to understand the significance of the astrological forces, we must first understand the role of angels in the chain between the Sefirot and the physical world. The Sefirot are in the universe of Atzilut, and below this is Beriyah, the universe of the Throne, which serves to allow the Sefirot to interact with the lower worlds. Between Beriyah and Asiyah is Yetzirah, the world of the angels. ....every one of God's words is actually an angel. When we speak of "God's word," we are actually speaking of His interaction with the lower worlds. The force that transverses the spiritual domain is what we call an angel. The stars also form an important link in God's providence over the physical world. Between God and man, there are many levels of interaction, the lowest being those of the angels and the stars, The Midrash thus teaches, "There is no blade of grass that does not have a constellation (Mazal) over it, telling it to grow." As the commentators explain it, God's providence works through the angels, but these angels, in turn, work through the stars and planets.

However, Kaplan also writes,

Faith and trust in God are partners, since one who believes in an omniscient, omnipotent and benevolent God must also believe that He will provide for His faithful. Therefore, one should trust in God and not be overly concerned about the future. ... Therefore, one should not seek to ascertain the future by fortune telling, astrology or other superstitions. Concerning this, The Torah commands us, "You must remain totally faithful to God your Lord" (Deut. 18:13), which some authorities count as a positive commandment.

== Kabbalistic astrology ==
Kabbalistic astrology, also called mazal or mazalot, ("zodiac," "destiny") is a system of astrology based upon the kabbalah. It is used to interpret and delineate a person's birth chart, seeking to understand it through a kabbalistic lens.

Most astrologers cast and use horoscopes to depict planetary placements which are believed to influence daily activities. Kabbalistic astrologers tend to take a slightly different approach because they wish to observe the planets as they relate to each sephira in the Tree of Life.

Each sephira points to a specific character trait. Each sephira in the trestleboard corresponds with a specific planet and is therefore closely aligned with the celestial art of astrology.

=== Hebrew calendar correlation to zodiac ===
The work Sefer HaMazalot identified the 12 constellations of the zodiac with the 12 months of the Hebrew calendar. The correspondence of the constellations with their names in Hebrew and the months is as follows:

No.	Latin Name	Hebrew Name	English translation	Jewish Month
1	Aries	Ṭaleh	The Ram	Nisan
2	Taurus	Shor	The Bull	Iyar
3	Gemini	Teomim	The Twins	Sivan
4	Cancer	Sarṭan	The Crab	Tammuz
5	Leo	Aryeh	The Lion	Av
6	Virgo	Betulah	The Virgin	Elul
7	Libra	Moznayim	The Scales	Tishrei
8	Scorpio	'Aḳrav	The Scorpion	Cheshvan
9	Sagittarius	Ḳashat	The Archer, The Bow	Kislev
10	Capricorn	G'di	The Goat, The Kid	Tevet
11	Aquarius	D'li	The Water-Bearer	Shevat
12	Pisces	Dagim	The Fish	Adar

Some scholars identified the 12 signs of the zodiac with the 12 sons of Jacob/Twelve Tribes of Israel.

=== Planetary correspondences ===
Each of the ten sephirot corresponds to an astrological feature. These astrological correspondences exist in the world of Assiah, the lowest of the Four Worlds of kabbalah.

Sephira Name	Planetary Correspondence	Astrological Sign
Keter	Pluto	Infinite light
Chokmah	Neptune	The Zodiac
Binah	Saturn	Capricorn, Aquarius
Chesed	Jupiter	Sagittarius, Pisces
Gevurah	Mars	Aries, Scorpio
Tiferet	Sun	Leo
Netzach	Venus	Taurus, Libra
Hod	Mercury	Gemini, Virgo
Yesod	Moon	Cancer
Malkuth	Earth	Ascendant

=== Mystical connection of scriptures and menorah to the 7 classical planets and lunar phases ===
The ancient Hebrews were well aware of the Sun, Moon, and five planets seen with the naked eye and Hebrew mysticism recognized their great importance. Therefore, along with the 4 lunar phases being slightly over 7 days (~7.4 days) each, the number 7 was held in very high regard. The Torah reflects this with (Genesis 1:1) being 7 words and 28 letters (7×4) in its original Hebrew. This is known as God's signature.

Genesis 1:14, "And God said, 'Let there be lights in the heavens to separate the day from the night, and let them serve as signs to mark seasons, days, years and festivals'...the 4th day (of 7)." The #7 is the great recurring numerical theme of the Hebrew (and Christian) scriptures. The menorah's 7 lamps on 6 branches correspond to the lights of the 7 Classical planets: Moon, Mercury, Venus, Sun (4th), Mars, Jupiter, and Saturn.

== See also ==
- Astrology in the medieval Islamic world
- Christian views on astrology
- Hebrew astronomy
- Islam and astrology
- Jewish astrology
- Kabbalah
- Mazzaroth
- Renaissance magic
- Sefer Raziel HaMalakh
- Sefer Yetzirah
- Zodiac mosaics in ancient synagogues
