= Jewish astrology =

Jewish astrology (Hebrew: מַזָּלוֹת, romanized: mazzālôt, lit. 'constellations') is the system of belief in some forms of Judaism that celestial bodies can influence the affairs of Earth and life thereon. Jewish astrology involves the study of the celestial bodies' respective 'energies' based on recurring patterns that change by the hour, by the week, month, year, or by several years (time categories). In each of these time categories one of the seven planetary spheres, or what are known as the seven classical planets: the Sun, Venus, Mercury, the Moon, Saturn, Jupiter, or Mars, along with the month's current Zodiac constellation, come into play and influence the sublunary world. At times, it involves a complex combination of several of these factors working together. From the biblical text, Rabbi Shimon ben Pazi, an amora, is recorded in the midrashic text Genesis Rabbah 10:6 teaching, "There is not a single blade of grass that does not have a constellation in the firmament that strikes it and says to it: 'Grow.'"

Complementary to the records of past civilisations, the corpus of Jewish literature has preserved many of the details instructive of the determining factors involved in rendering any astrological forecast, although astrology, in terms of modern science, is understood to be a pseudoscience.

== Rabbinic belief ==
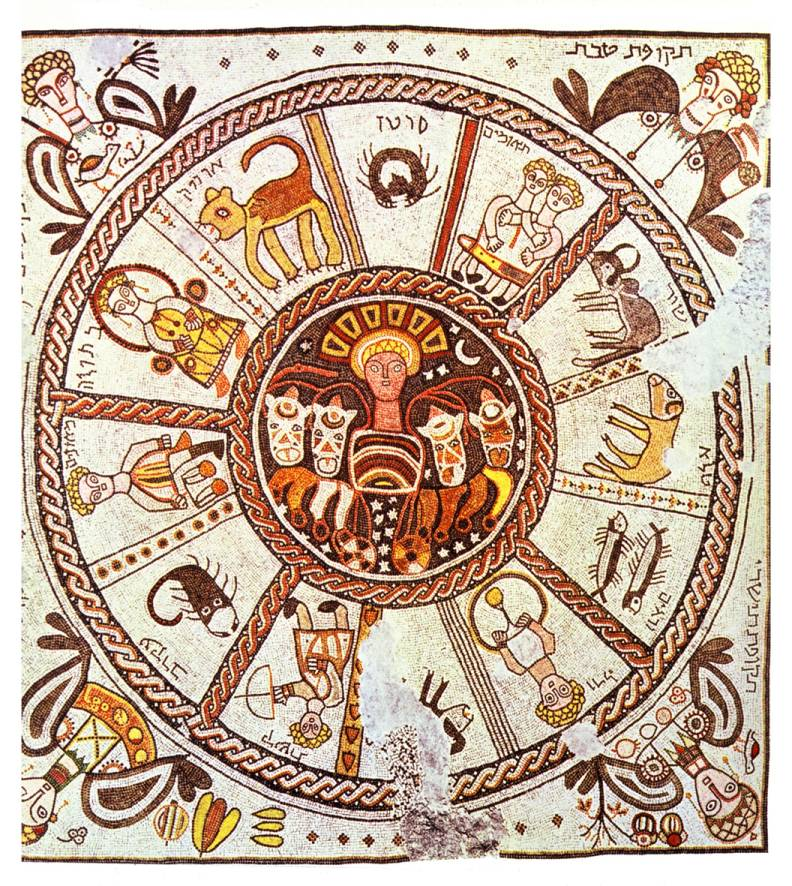
5th-century mosaic from Judea showing the signs of the Zodiac

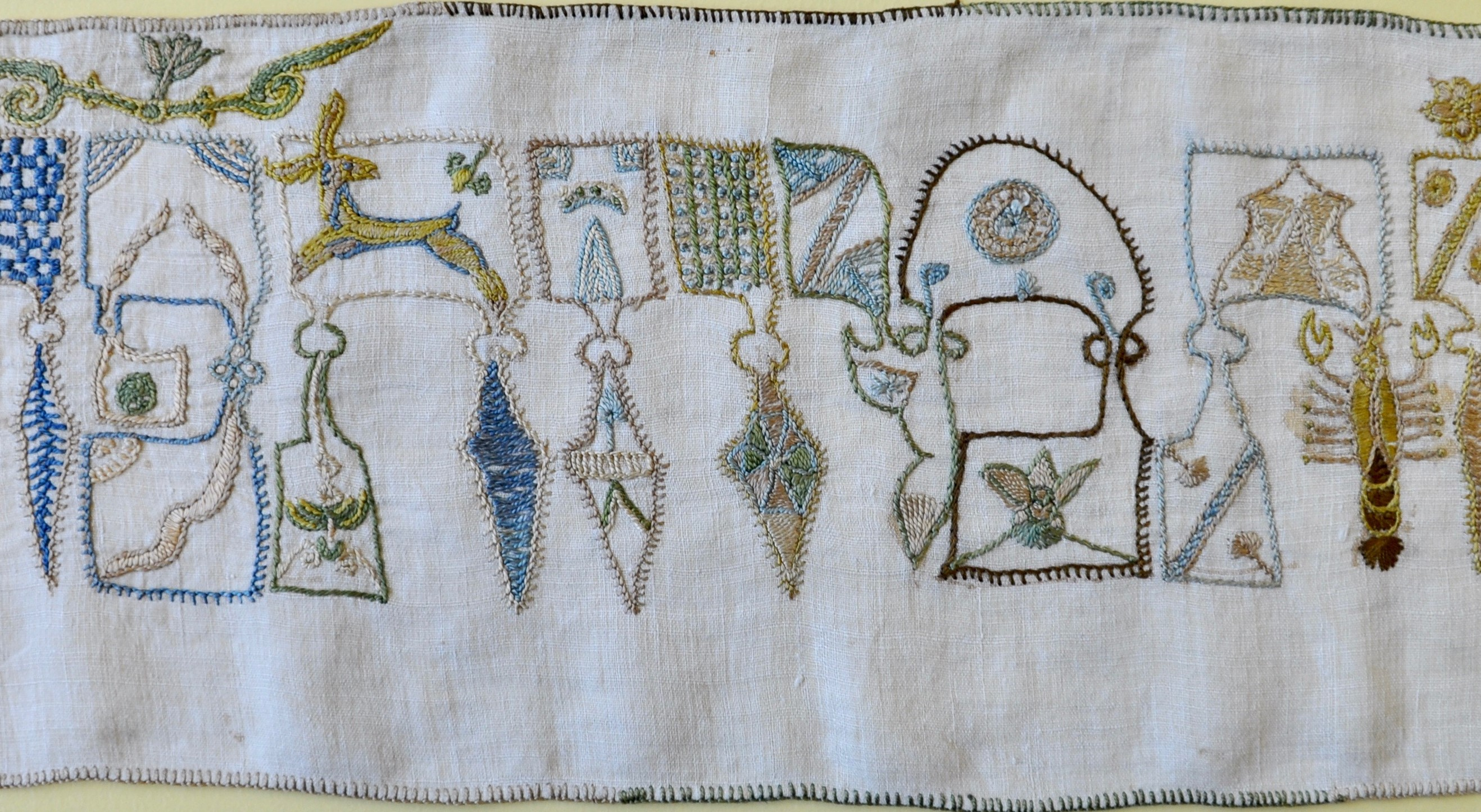
Lengnau wimpel from 1726 showing a finely embroidered scorpion, in the collection of the Jewish Museum of Switzerland.

A famous meme that underscores the importance with which Judaism views the influences of the horoscope is found in the Idra of the Zohar:

Everything is dependent upon mazzal (astral influences), even the Torah scroll in the ark. (הַכֹּל תָּלוּי בְּמַזָּל, וַאֲפִילּוּ סֵפֶר תּוֹרָה בָּהֵיכָל)

In the Babylonian Talmud, a controversy is presented among the sages of Israel as to whether the changing signs of the zodiac affect a person's destiny. The supportive opinions are of Joshua ben Levi, who lists the types of people according to their various zodiac signs, and of Hanina bar Hama, who believes that the astrological constellations (mazzal) can make a person wise and can even make a person wealthy. Conversely, Johanan bar Nappaha held the view that "Israel is not bound by the effects of the changing horoscopes." He assayed to bring proof from a verse taken from the prophet Jeremiah: "Learn not the way of the nations, nor be dismayed at the signs of the heavens because the nations are dismayed at them."

The opinions of Abba Arikha, of Samuel of Nehardea and of Rabbi Akiva, however, seem to be supportive of applied astrology, even though the people of Israel are not bound by the influences of the constellations. Other rabbis have vaunted their knowledge of applied astrology. Said Samuel of Nehardea, "I know the pathways of heaven as I do the pathways of Nehardea, excepting the comet, about which I know nothing."

Rabbi Shimon ben Pazi reported that Rabbi Yehoshua ben Levi said in the name of Bar Kappara: Anyone who knows how to calculate astronomical seasons and the movement of constellations and does not do so, the verse says about him: "They do not take notice of the work of God, and they do not see His handiwork" (Isaiah 5:12).

In several places in the Talmud it is stated that every man has a celestial body (mazzal), i.e. a particular star which is his patron from conception and birth (Shabbat 53b; Baba Kama 2b) and which perceives things unknown to the man himself (Megillah 3a; Sanhedrin 94a). Two people born under the same star are also said to have a bodily and spiritual kinship (Nedarim 39b; Baba Metzia 30b).

Rava says, "Duration of life, progeny, and subsistence are dependent upon the constellations."

The great men of Israel in the Middle Ages, viz., Saadia Gaon, in his commentary on the Sefer Yetzirah; Solomon ibn Gabirol in his Keter Malkhut, and Abraham bar Hiyya, ha-Nasi and Abraham ibn Ezra considered astrology to be true wisdom and even expressed this belief in their works. Judah Halevi also acknowledges in his magnum opus, the Kuzari, that the celestial bodies have an influence on earthly affairs, but does not admit that the astrologers have the ability to determine the mode of operation of the star systems on human beings and other living creatures in the terrestrial world.

Maimonides, who lived in the late twelfth century, took a more critical approach to the topic of astrology, ruling that man was entirely incapable of foretelling futurities by observing the celestial bodies, especially if those same astrological formulae were faulty. (Note: Maimonides wrote in his Epistle to Yemen (ch. xiii): "I note that you are inclined to believe in astrology and in the influence of the past and future conjunctions of the planets upon human affairs. You should dismiss such notions from your thoughts. Cleanse your mind as one cleanses dirty clothes. Accomplished scholars whether they are religious or not, refuse to believe in the truth of this science. Its postulates can be refuted by real proofs on national grounds" (End Quote). The reason for this is because Jews in Yemen thought that a dearth of scientific knowledge in their country was the result of the constellations, viz., the influence of the conjunctions in the earthly trigon. [Background: Medieval astrological compilations written in the Arabic language had divided the signs of the zodiac into four groups of three, called trigons, named after the four elements: the airy trigon which included Gemini, Libra, and Aquarius; the earthly trigon, comprising Taurus, Virgo, and Capricornis; the fiery trigon, consisting of Aries, Leo, and Sagittarius, and, lastly, the watery trigon, made up of Cancer, Scipio, and Pisces (cf. Nallino, Encyclopedia of Islam, s. v. Astrology. p. 495)]. Maimonides called out their error, showing how there had been learned men in Israel who lived during a time when the earthly trigon constellations reigned supreme.) He, therefore, cancelled its practice altogether. Among the rabbis of the Middle Ages, Maimonides was the sole antagonist of such practices. One of his contemporaries and disputants, Abraham ben David, in his glosses to Maimonides' Mishneh Torah (Hil. Teshuvah 5:5), asserts the influence of the stars upon destiny, while contending that by faith in God man may overcome this influence.

Moshe Chaim Luzzatto, during the Age of Enlightenment and although never actually having used his knowledge of the occult to foretell futurities, speaks about the influences of the stars in his book, Derekh Hashem (II, chapter 7 – The Influence of Stars). (Note: Short excerpt from Luzzatto's book: "There is another function that God assigned to the stars. Every event and situation in the material world is prepared and initiated on high, and then is transmitted via the stars, step by step, finally appearing in the desired physical forms below. For example, life itself, wealth, wisdom, children and so forth all originate on high in the realm of the spiritual Roots, reflected down through Branches of these Roots through the agency of particular stars, so that the different phenomena take form on earth in their desired states. This is the result of particular divisions and combinations of the stars, following their specific cycles. Every event that takes place in the terrestrial world is allocated to a particular star, depending on its specific category. All terrestrial things are bound under their authority. Through their systems, all things happen as a result of the influence emanating from the stellar array through its connection with each individual thing. Every human being is also subjugated to this system, and whatever happens to him is a result of this astrological influence. It is also possible, however, that this stellar influence be overridden by a higher power. [Accordingly], our Sages teach us, '[The people of] Israel are not bound by the influences of the horoscope (mazzal).' The power of God's decrees and influence is stronger than that of the stars, and what results is therefore dependent on this higher influence rather than on the astrological." [End Quote])

== Proscription against idolatry ==
The rabbis have distinguished between gaining an occult knowledge of the stars' influences on human beings (which is permitted) and the actual worshipping of the stars (which is prohibited), a view that is also met with the Scripture; cf. [the stars and all the host of heaven] "which the Lord thy God hath divided unto all nations" (Deut. 4:19), that is to say, the stars, which God appointed to be the means of governing His creatures, and not the objects of man's worship.

The Midrash HaGadol (on Deuteronomy 4:19) clarifies what is meant by, "[And beware] lest you raise your eyes to heaven, etc." It is hereby inferred that you are not to say, 'since these stars and constellations govern the world, and they provide light unto the entire universe, and they serve before their Creator on High, it is fitting that we serve them and bow down unto them, just as the king would want [all] human beings to behave with respect towards his servants and ministers.' For this reason it says, lest you raise your eyes to heaven, beware that you do not err in this manner, on account of what [is written], which the Lord thy God hath divided unto all nations. They (i.e. the astrological horoscopes) have been delivered into the hands of the nations, so that they may live [thereby] and their beings be sustained [thereby], [without] suffering loss, as is the custom of the world. But you (i.e. the nation of Israel) have been given over to me, and I do not behave towards you as is customarily practised with all the world, as it says, But the Lord has taken you (Deut. 4:20), etc. Likewise he says, Learn not the way of the nations, nor be dismayed at the signs of the heavens; for the gentiles are dismayed at them (Jer. 10:2). The nations of the world are alarmed by them, but Israel is not alarmed by them."

A similar theme is found in other rabbinic literature concerning Abraham the patriarch, who, although wise in the astrological sciences, and who saw thereby that he would not beget any children, was reprimanded by God who said to him: "Break away from your astrological speculations, for [the people of] Israel are not bound by the influences of the horoscope." By this Rashi learnt that through prayers, repentance and meritorious deeds (sometimes also through a change of name), they are able to alter what has been determined for them.

The people of Israel are prohibited by Jewish law to consult the astrologers and star-gazers for guidance, but are commanded to be perfect in their awe of God and to consult him for guidance, even when they are told by astrologers what might happen.

== Astral influences and how they are determined ==
The day is divided into 12 equal hours. The night, likewise, is divided into 12 equal hours. In both cases, the method of configuration used in measuring the hour is known as the Relative hour. To determine the length of each relative hour, one needs but simply know two variables: (a) the precise time of sunrise, and (b) the precise time of sunset. Although in Talmudic literature one begins to reckon the beginning of a day some 72 minutes before sunrise and where each day ends 13½ minutes after the sun has already set, here, in the case of astrological computations, it was only necessary to reckon the day from the moment of sunrise. Rashi, however, alludes to the day beginning at dawn (עמוד השחר). By collecting the total number of minutes in any given day (from daylight hours) and dividing the total number of minutes by 12, the quotient that one is left with is the number of minutes to each hour. In summer months, when the days are long, the length of each hour during daytime can be as much as 77 minutes or more, whereas the length of each hour during nighttime can be less than 42 minutes.

To each hour of the day and night is assigned one of the seven planets or spheres, which same planet governs the world during that hour. The names of these planets are: Saturn (shabtai), Venus (nogah), Jupiter (tzedek), Mercury (kokhav), Mars (ma'adim), Moon (levanah) and the Sun (ḥamah). [Note: The ancients conceived that there were only seven primary planets. The moon, although a satellite rather than a planet, was also numbered among them; the sun, which is a star rather than a planet, was also numbered among them. The earth was not numbered among them since it was central to the rest. Uranus, Neptune and Pluto, as well as the other recently discovered planets and satellites, were not known to the ancients, and therefore are considered trivial to the rest]. The star or planet that begins the first diurnal hour of a particular weekday, or the first nocturnal hour of a particular weeknight, it is the same star or planet that broadly governs that entire day or night. (Note: "The star that begins is the star that rules the entire day or night." This revelation prompted Rabbi Eliezer ben Joel HaLevi (known by the acronym Rabiah), when speaking on the shaliach tzibbur who cites on Friday night the abridged prayer taken from the seven blessings of the Shabbat evening Amida prayer (ברכת מעין שבעה), to say that the Sages specifically instituted the prayer to be said on Friday nights (i.e. which marks the beginning of the Sabbath, or Saturday in Jewish tradition) to counter-act and defend against the negative influences of Mars (Hebrew: מאדים), since it is the star that begins to serve on that night, making it the energy that prevails on each and every night of the Sabbath. Echoing the same concerns, Magen Avraham wrote in his commentary on the Shulchan Aruch (Orach Chayim, section 271): "It is written in the Tikkunei Shabbat that a person ought to make the kiddush [over the Sabbath day] before nightfall, because the celestial energies of Mars (Hebrew: מאדים) start at the outset of the Sabbath night, whereas at the end of the day on Friday, it belongs to the celestial energies of Jupiter (Hebrew: צדק). Therefore, let him make the kiddush [at the hour] of Jupiter, and thus do we find written in the Responsa of Maharil, responsum no. 163." Some Hasidic groups still observe this practice.)

Number	Lunar month	Zodiac (Hebrew)	Zodiac (Latin)	No. of days	Composition
1	Nisan	טלה, (ṭaleh)	Aries (nature: fire)	30 days	represented by 13 stars
2	Iyar	שור, (shor)	Taurus (nature: earth)	29 days	represented by 33 stars
3	Sivan	תאומים, (te’umim)	Gemini (nature: wind)	30 days	represented by 18 stars
4	Tammuz	סרטן, (sarṭan)	Cancer (nature: water)	29 days	represented by 9 stars
5	Av	אריה, (arieh)	Leo (nature: fire)	30 days	represented by 60 stars
6	Elul	בתולה, (betulah)	Virgo (nature: earth)	29 days	represented by 25 stars
7	Tishri	מאזנים, (moznayim)	Libra (nature: wind)	30 days	represented by 8 stars
8	Cheshvan	עקרב, (ʻaḳrab)	Scorpio (nature: water)	29 days (Note: During a complete year in the Hebrew calendar, the lunar month of Cheshvan is 30 days.)	represented by 21 stars
9	Kislev	קשת, (ḳeshet)	Sagittarius (nature: fire)	30 days (Note: During a defective year in the Hebrew calendar, the lunar month of Kislev is 29 days.)	represented by 31 stars
10	Tevet	גדי, (ğedi)	Capricorn (nature: earth)	29 days	represented by 28 stars
11	Shevat	דלי, (deli)	Aquarius (nature: wind)	30 days	represented by 42 stars
12	Adar	דגים, (dagim)	Pisces (nature: water)	29 days (Note: During a Hebrew Leap Year, when a second lunar month of Adar is added to the Hebrew calendar, the first Adar is 29 days, while the second Adar is 30 days.)	represented by 34 stars

The observance and reckoning of the movements of the 12 constellations are believed by some scholars to have been learnt from Hellenistic culture, after first being divested of influences that were deemed idolatrous.

Accordingly, it was believed that God determined that each of the seven planets be subordinate to the twelve constellations of the Zodiac, and work in conjunction with them. For example, the Sun is directly subservient to the influences emanating from the constellation known as Leo, while the Moon is subservient to the influences emanating from the constellation known as Cancer. Mars is subservient to the influences emanating from two constellations, namely, Aries and Scorpio. The planet Venus is also subservient to the influences emanating from two constellations, namely, Taurus and Libra. The planet Mercury is, likewise, subservient to two constellations, drawing its influences from them, namely, that of Gemini and Virgo. The planet Saturn is subservient to two constellations, those being Capricorn and Aquarius, whence it draws its influences. Finally, the planet Jupiter is directly subordinate to the influences emanating from Sagittarius and Pisces.

Weekly nocturnal duties: Each of the seven planets takes turn governing one day of the week, with the active involvement of all the planets on that same day working in concert, hour after hour, day by day, night by night, such that on the evening that commences Sunday (i.e. Saturday night), the night is governed by Mercury (kokhav), which begins its turn of duty in the first hour of the night, followed by all the other planets one after the other. On the evening that commences Monday (i.e. Sunday night), the night is governed by Jupiter (tzedek), which begins its turn of duty in the first hour of the night, followed by all the other planets one after the other. And so it is in this manner all throughout the week, the evening that commences Tuesday (i.e. Monday night) is governed by Venus (nogah); the evening that commences Wednesday (i.e. Tuesday night) is governed by Saturn (shabtai); the evening that commences Thursday (i.e. Wednesday night) is governed by the Sun (ḥamah); the evening that commences Friday (i.e. Thursday night) is governed by the Moon (levanah); the evening that commences Saturday (i.e. Friday night) is governed by Mars (ma'adim). The mnemonic used to denote this order is כצנ"ש חל"ם.

Hourly nocturnal duties: Since each planet takes its turn of duty in the 12-hour night, the order taken in their hourly rotation is as follows: When Mercury (kokhav) finishes the 1st hour of the night, it is joined by the Moon (levanah) who takes up the 2nd hour of the night, followed by Saturn (shabtai) who takes up the 3rd hour of the night, followed by Jupiter (tzedek) who takes up the 4th hour of the night, followed by Mars (ma'adim) who takes up the 5th hour of the night, followed by the Sun (ḥamah) whose influence takes up the 6th hour of the night, followed by Venus (nogah) who takes up the 7th hour of the night, and in this order it is repeated until the 12-hour night has concluded for each of the seven nights. This hourly rotation is denoted by the mnemonic כל"ש צמח"ן. Fixing their rotation in such a way, hour by hour, was seen as vital in order to determine the character of the child who is born at any given hour of the night, based on the hour's acting "mazzal" (astrological influence), in accordance with the principle laid out by Rabbi Hanina: "Not the constellation of the day but that of the hour is the determining influence."

Weekly diurnal duties: As in the night, so, too, each of the 12-hour weekdays has a set order pre-determined for it, while each of the seven planets rotating and serving in its respective hour. However, the planet that began to serve in the first hour of the night is not the same planet that begins in the first hour of the day. During the weekdays, the first hour of the first day of the week (Sunday), starts with the influences of the Sun (hence: Sunday); the first hour of the second day of the week (Monday) starts with the influences of the Moon (hence: Monday); the first hour of the third day of the week (Tuesday) with Mars, and the first hour of the fourth day of the week (Wednesday) with Mercury, while the first hour of the fifth day of the week (Thursday) with Jupiter, and the first hour of the sixth day of the week (Friday) with Venus, and lastly, the first hour of the seventh day of the week (Saturday) with Saturn. The mnemonic used to denote this order is חל"ם כצנ"ש.

Hourly diurnal duties: When the Sun finishes the 1st hour of the day on Sunday, it is joined by Venus who takes up the 2nd hour of the day on Sunday, followed by Mercury who takes up the 3rd hour of the day on Sunday, followed by the Moon whose influence takes up the 4th hour of the day on Sunday, followed by Saturn who takes up the 5th hour of the day on Sunday, followed by Jupiter who takes up the 6th hour of the day on Sunday, followed by Mars who takes up the 7th hour of the day on Sunday, and in this order it is repeated until the 12-hour day has concluded. Again, fixing their rotation in such a way, hour by hour, was seen as vital in order to determine the character of the child who is born at any given hour of the day. The mnemonic used by the Sages of Israel to remember their order of rotation is שצ"ם חנכ"ל = ShaTzaM ḤaNKaL (shabtai [= Saturn] → tzedek [= Jupiter] → ma'adim [= Mars] → ḥamah [= Sun] → nogah [= Venus] → kokhav [= Mercury] → levanah [= Moon]).

Although each of the seven planets will rotate one after the other on an hourly basis, whether by day or whether by night, it is only the planet or orb that began to serve in the first hour, whether by day or whether by night, that is considered the principal planet and master of that entire day (if it began its turn of duty in the first hour of the day), or the principal planet and master of that entire night (if it began its turn of duty in the first hour of the night). (Note: This phenomenon is described in the Babylonian Talmud (Shabbat 129b), where it asks: "What is the reason that one is not to perform bloodletting on the day of Tuesday?" Rashi (ibid., s.v. דקיימא ליה מאדים בזווי) and Rabbeinu Chananel (ibid.) explain that it is because Mars (Heb. ma'adim) is the chief celestial energy emanating from the heavens on that day of the week, and which may invariably put that person's life in danger. They go on to name the respective stars (orbs and planets) that govern each day of the week, in their set order.) The participation of all the other planets on that same day or that same night is inconsequential to the fact that the mazzal (= astral influences) for that day, or what is called mazzal yom, belongs to the planet that began serving in the first hour of the day, or in the first hour of the night, while the other planets are only concerned with their specific hour, or what is called mazzal sha'ah.

Since the Moon begins its turn of duty in the first hour of every Monday morning, and Jupiter begins its turn of duty in the first hour of every Thursday morning, and since both these planets are considered planets possessing good influences, it follows that Mondays and Thursdays are considered auspicious days in the Jewish calendar.

=== Energies emanating from the seven classical planets ===
Number	Classical planet	Hebrew name	Clime (chief sphere of influence)	Birth qualities (for those born under its star)	Worldwide influences
1	Moon	לבנה, (levanah)	7th clime	Those born under its influences, such as those born on either the day of Monday or on the night of Friday, are apt to be dull; lacking understanding. Inclined to find favor and love in the eyes of others, or else show the same to others. Able to bear patiently illnesses; builds and tears down and vice-versa.	Cold and humidity are under its influences. Its virtue is to act with its light on the trees and plants; tidal waves of the sea controlled by moon's waning and waxing; preserves moisture in plants and animals towards the end of its lunation, during which time women are best able to conceive
2	Mercury	כוכב, (kokhav)	6th clime	Those born under this star, either on the day of Wednesday or on the night of Sunday, will have teaching abilities, and an analytical mind, such as needed to perform special skills and artistic talents. Having a strong inclination towards wisdom, prudence and good understanding.	Awakens in the world strife and contentions and enmities, as well as gossip, but also gives strength to do virtuously and to heap up wealth and riches, as well as provisions. Its influences work both good and bad.
3	Venus	נוגה, (nogah)	5th clime	Those persons born under this star, either on the day of Friday or on the night of Tuesday, will be of a beautiful countenance and will find favor among others, and will have a comely manner of speech. They are strongly motivated by desire, happiness and joy.	Cold is under its influences. Awakens in the world tranquility and calm, happiness and rejoicing, carols and joyful songs, the merriment associated with weddings, while binding together all fruitful produce and other flora, its influences being utterly good.
4	Sun	חמה, (ḥamah)	4th clime	Those persons born under this star, meaning, born either on the day of Sunday or on the night of Thursday, will attain to a higher level of virtue than their ancestors. Those born under its influences have a propensity for greatness, personal elevation and prideful arrogance.	Renews wonders in the world, whether for abundance or for privation; whether for peace or for war; occasionally working to bring down and to depose of kingdoms, while at other times working to establish and to raise up [others].
5	Mars	מאדים, (ma’adim)	3rd clime	Those person's born under this star, either on the day of Tuesday or on the night of Saturday, will be courageous. Thefts, envy and hatred are the traits found in those born under its influences.	Heat and dryness are under its influences. Awakens in the world wars and killings and desolation, as well as a multitude of other troubles; the burning of cities and bloodshed. Its influences are bad and harmful, as if to rid the [unwanted] thorns from the vineyards.
6	Jupiter	צדק, (tzedek)	2nd clime	Those born under its influences, meaning, born either on the day of Thursday or on the night of Monday, are associated with fruitfulness (procreation), goodness, equity, and calms what is inevitable, and enhances justice. Those persons born under this star will become both prudent and wise.	Awakens in the world heat and humidity. Awakens probity and repentance and good-will and love, as well as every good virtue, while bringing an end to wars and hostility and conflict, and allowing for the increase of the earth's fruits. Its influences are utterly good.
7	Saturn	שבתי, (shabtai)	1st clime	Those born under its star, meaning, born either on the day of Saturday or on the night of Wednesday, are apt to be unsuccessful; associated with failure. Those born under its influences are inclined to do evil, whether suicidal death or murder, and to spread enmity and hatred.	Coldness and dryness are under its influences. Awakens wars and captivity, plundering and famine, while also destroying countries and quickly uprooting kingdoms, insofar that its influences are bad and bring harm, as if it were to bring an end to the wicked of the earth.

By saying, "on the night of such-and-such a weekday," the sense here is to the idea in Jewish tradition, where nightfall ushers-in a new day, as is written (Gen. 1:5): "And the evening and the morning were the first day." Therefore, the "night of Sunday" is to be understood as beginning on Saturday night, when the first three stars appear in the night sky; the "night of Saturday" is, likewise, to be understood as beginning on Friday night, when the first three stars appear in the night sky, and so forth, and so on.

=== Other factors taken into consideration ===
To accurately determine the time in which each of the classical planets are in their respective line of duty, per hour, one must either have access to a printed lunar calendar showing the Jewish months, and know the precise starting point for each day and night, or else be familiar with the ever-changing aspects of the Jewish months, as the planetary influences will change with the conjunction of the moon with the sun, also known as the New Moon (occurring every 29 days, 12 hours and 793 parts of an hour), as also with the intercalation of the lunar month during a Jewish Leap Year (occurring seven times in a 19-year period), when the lunar month Nisan and its influences will be delayed by one month on account of an additional lunar month Adar. Moreover, the length of each 12-hour day fluctuates, depending on summer and winter. Several online websites provide conversion tables for converting a known date in the Gregorian calendar with the corresponding weekday, day and month in the Hebrew calendar.

Tables showing planetary influences per hour (click to open)

Table no. 1
Sunday (hours of night)	Sunday (hours of day)
1^{st} hour = Mercury כוכב, (kokhav)	1^{st} hour = Sun חמה, (ḥamah)
2^{nd} hour = Moon לבנה, (levanah)	2^{nd} hour = Venus נוגה, (nogah)
3^{rd} hour = Saturn שבתאי, (shabtai)	3^{rd} hour = Mercury כוכב, (kokhav)
4^{th} hour = Jupiter צדק, (tzedek)	4^{th} hour = Moon לבנה, (levanah)
5^{th} hour = Mars מאדים, (ma'adim)	5^{th} hour = Saturn שבתאי, (shabtai)
6^{th} hour = Sun חמה, (ḥamah)	6^{th} hour = Jupiter צדק, (tzedek)
7^{th} hour = Venus נוגה, (nogah)	7^{th} hour = Mars מאדים, (ma'adim)
8^{th} hour = Mercury כוכב, (kokhav)	8^{th} hour = Sun חמה, (ḥamah)
9^{th} hour = Moon לבנה, (levanah)	9^{th} hour = Venus נוגה, (nogah)
10^{th} hour = Saturn שבתאי, (shabtai)	10^{th} hour = Mercury כוכב, (kokhav)
11^{th} hour = Jupiter צדק, (tzedek)	11^{th} hour = Moon לבנה, (levanah)
12^{th} hour = Mars מאדים, (ma'adim)	12^{th} hour = Saturn שבתאי, (shabtai)

Table no. 2
Monday (hours of night)	Monday (hours of day)
1^{st} hour = Jupiter צדק, (tzedek)	1^{st} hour = Moon לבנה, (levanah)
2^{nd} hour = Mars מאדים, (ma'adim)	2^{nd} hour = Saturn שבתאי, (shabtai)
3^{rd} hour = Sun חמה, (ḥamah)	3^{rd} hour = Jupiter צדק, (tzedek)
4^{th} hour = Venus נוגה, (nogah)	4^{th} hour = Mars מאדים, (ma'adim)
5^{th} hour = Mercury כוכב, (kokhav)	5^{th} hour = Sun חמה, (ḥamah)
6^{th} hour = Moon לבנה, (levanah)	6^{th} hour = Venus נוגה, (nogah)
7^{th} hour = Saturn שבתאי, (shabtai)	7^{th} hour = Mercury כוכב, (kokhav)
8^{th} hour = Jupiter צדק, (tzedek)	8^{th} hour = Moon לבנה, (levanah)
9^{th} hour = Mars מאדים, (ma'adim)	9^{th} hour = Saturn שבתאי, (shabtai)
10^{th} hour = Sun חמה, (ḥamah)	10^{th} hour = Jupiter צדק, (tzedek)
11^{th} hour = Venus נוגה, (nogah)	11^{th} hour = Mars מאדים, (ma'adim)
12^{th} hour = Mercury כוכב, (kokhav)	12^{th} hour = Sun חמה, (ḥamah)

Table no. 3
Tuesday (hours of night)	Tuesday (hours of day)
1^{st} hour = Venus נוגה, (nogah)	1^{st} hour = Mars מאדים, (ma'adim)
2^{nd} hour = Mercury כוכב, (kokhav)	2^{nd} hour = Sun חמה, (ḥamah)
3^{rd} hour = Moon לבנה, (levanah)	3^{rd} hour = Venus נוגה, (nogah)
4^{th} hour = Saturn שבתאי, (shabtai)	4^{th} hour = Mercury כוכב, (kokhav)
5^{th} hour = Jupiter צדק, (tzedek)	5^{th} hour = Moon לבנה, (levanah)
6^{th} hour = Mars מאדים, (ma'adim)	6^{th} hour = Saturn שבתאי, (shabtai)
7^{th} hour = Sun חמה, (ḥamah)	7^{th} hour = Jupiter צדק, (tzedek)
8^{th} hour = Venus נוגה, (nogah)	8^{th} hour = Mars מאדים, (ma'adim)
9^{th} hour = Mercury כוכב, (kokhav)	9^{th} hour = Sun חמה, (ḥamah)
10^{th} hour = Moon לבנה, (levanah)	10^{th} hour = Venus נוגה, (nogah)
11^{th} hour = Saturn שבתאי, (shabtai)	11^{th} hour = Mercury כוכב, (kokhav)
12^{th} hour = Jupiter צדק, (tzedek)	12^{th} hour = Moon לבנה, (levanah)

Table no. 4
Wednesday (hours of night)	Wednesday (hours of day)
1^{st} hour = Saturn שבתאי, (shabtai)	1^{st} hour = Mercury כוכב, (kokhav)
2^{nd} hour = Jupiter צדק, (tzedek)	2^{nd} hour = Moon לבנה, (levanah)
3^{rd} hour = Mars מאדים, (ma'adim)	3^{rd} hour = Saturn שבתאי, (shabtai)
4^{th} hour = Sun חמה, (ḥamah)	4^{th} hour = Jupiter צדק, (tzedek)
5^{th} hour = Venus נוגה, (nogah)	5^{th} hour = Mars מאדים, (ma'adim)
6^{th} hour = Mercury כוכב, (kokhav)	6^{th} hour = Sun חמה, (ḥamah)
7^{th} hour = Moon לבנה, (levanah)	7^{th} hour = Venus נוגה, (nogah)
8^{th} hour = Saturn שבתאי, (shabtai)	8^{th} hour = Mercury כוכב, (kokhav)
9^{th} hour = Jupiter צדק, (tzedek)	9^{th} hour = Moon לבנה, (levanah)
10^{th} hour = Mars מאדים, (ma'adim)	10^{th} hour = Saturn שבתאי, (shabtai)
11^{th} hour = Sun חמה, (ḥamah)	11^{th} hour = Jupiter צדק, (tzedek)
12^{th} hour = Venus נוגה, (nogah)	12^{th} hour = Mars מאדים, (ma'adim)

Table no. 5
Thursday (hours of night)	Thursday (hours of day)
1^{st} hour = Sun חמה, (ḥamah)	1^{st} hour = Jupiter צדק, (tzedek)
2^{nd} hour = Venus נוגה, (nogah)	2^{nd} hour = Mars מאדים, (ma'adim)
3^{rd} hour = Mercury כוכב, (kokhav)	3^{rd} hour = Sun חמה, (ḥamah)
4^{th} hour = Moon לבנה, (levanah)	4^{th} hour = Venus נוגה, (nogah)
5^{th} hour = Saturn שבתאי, (shabtai)	5^{th} hour = Mercury כוכב, (kokhav)
6^{th} hour = Jupiter צדק, (tzedek)	6^{th} hour = Moon לבנה, (levanah)
7^{th} hour = Mars מאדים, (ma'adim)	7^{th} hour = Saturn שבתאי, (shabtai)
8^{th} hour = Sun חמה, (ḥamah)	8^{th} hour = Jupiter צדק, (tzedek)
9^{th} hour = Venus נוגה, (nogah)	9^{th} hour = Mars מאדים, (ma'adim)
10^{th} hour = Mercury כוכב, (kokhav)	10^{th} hour = Sun חמה, (ḥamah)
11^{th} hour = Moon לבנה, (levanah)	11^{th} hour = Venus נוגה, (nogah)
12^{th} hour = Saturn שבתאי, (shabtai)	12^{th} hour = Mercury כוכב, (kokhav)

Table no. 6
Friday (hours of night)	Friday (hours of day)
1^{st} hour = Moon לבנה, (levanah)	1^{st} hour = Venus נוגה, (nogah)
2^{nd} hour = Saturn שבתאי, (shabtai)	2^{nd} hour = Mercury כוכב, (kokhav)
3^{rd} hour = Jupiter צדק, (tzedek)	3^{rd} hour = Moon לבנה, (levanah)
4^{th} hour = Mars מאדים, (ma'adim)	4^{th} hour = Saturn שבתאי, (shabtai)
5^{th} hour = Sun חמה, (ḥamah)	5^{th} hour = Jupiter צדק, (tzedek)
6^{th} hour = Venus נוגה, (nogah)	6^{th} hour = Mars מאדים, (ma'adim)
7^{th} hour = Mercury כוכב, (kokhav)	7^{th} hour = Sun חמה, (ḥamah)
8^{th} hour = Moon לבנה, (levanah)	8^{th} hour = Venus נוגה, (nogah)
9^{th} hour = Saturn שבתאי, (shabtai)	9^{th} hour = Mercury כוכב, (kokhav)
10^{th} hour = Jupiter צדק, (tzedek)	10^{th} hour = Moon לבנה, (levanah)
11^{th} hour = Mars מאדים, (ma'adim)	11^{th} hour = Saturn שבתאי, (shabtai)
12^{th} hour = Sun חמה, (ḥamah)	12^{th} hour = Jupiter צדק, (tzedek)

Table no. 7
Saturday (hours of night)	Saturday (hours of day)
1^{st} hour = Mars מאדים, (ma'adim)	1^{st} hour = Saturn שבתאי, (shabtai)
2^{nd} hour = Sun חמה, (ḥamah)	2^{nd} hour = Jupiter צדק, (tzedek)
3^{rd} hour = Venus נוגה, (nogah)	3^{rd} hour = Mars מאדים, (ma'adim)
4^{th} hour = Mercury כוכב, (kokhav)	4^{th} hour = Sun חמה, (ḥamah)
5^{th} hour = Moon לבנה, (levanah)	5^{th} hour = Venus נוגה, (nogah)
6^{th} hour = Saturn שבתאי, (shabtai)	6^{th} hour = Mercury כוכב, (kokhav)
7^{th} hour = Jupiter צדק, (tzedek)	7^{th} hour = Moon לבנה, (levanah)
8^{th} hour = Mars מאדים, (ma'adim)	8^{th} hour = Saturn שבתאי, (shabtai)
9^{th} hour = Sun חמה, (ḥamah)	9^{th} hour = Jupiter צדק, (tzedek)
10^{th} hour = Venus נוגה, (nogah)	10^{th} hour = Mars מאדים, (ma'adim)
11^{th} hour = Mercury כוכב, (kokhav)	11^{th} hour = Sun חמה, (ḥamah)
12^{th} hour = Moon לבנה, (levanah)	12^{th} hour = Venus נוגה, (nogah)

=== Events attributed to the influences of the constellations ===
- In Jewish thought, the destruction of, both, the First and Second Temples which happened in the lunar month of Av is linked to the astrological influences of Leo (arieh), which are generally considered to be bad. (Note: Quote: "Said Rabbi Abin: ‘A lion (Heb. arieh) has gone up’ (Jer. 4:7) under the astrological influences of Arieh (i.e. the Zodiac Leo), and he destroyed Ariel (i.e. nickname for Jerusalem). [When it says] ‘a lion has gone up,’ this is the wicked Nebuchadnezzar, as it is written of him, ‘A lion has gone up from his thicket’ (ibid.). ‘Under the astrological influences of Arieh,’ [meaning], ‘until the captivity of Jerusalem in the fifth month’ (i.e. the 5th lunar month Av in the Hebrew calendar)(Jer. 1:3). ‘And he destroyed Ariel,’ [meaning], ‘Ah, Ariel, Ariel, the city where David encamped!’ (Isa. 29:1). [Now all this was done] so that the lion (Heb. arieh) will come during the astrological influences of Arieh (i.e. the Zodiac Leo), and will build Ariel (i.e. the city of Jerusalem). [By saying], ‘the lion will come,’ this refers to the Holy One, blessed be He, as it is written of him: ‘The lion has roared; who will not fear?’ (Amos 3:8), etc." (End quote)) (Note: Quote: "...He (i.e. Nebuchadnezzar) sought to destroy it (i.e. the Jewish Temple) in the fourth [lunar month] (i.e. Tammuz), [but] the merit of Moses rose up [to protect it]. He (i.e. Moses) said: ‘Master of the universe! This crab lives not except in water, and I was rescued from the water’ (i.e. Play on words, as ‘crab’ in Hebrew is ‘sartan’, which word also means in Hebrew the Zodiac Cancer that is active in the fourth lunar month, although here it is humorously used as a pejorative for Nebuchadnezzar ). When he came to destroy it in the fifth [lunar month] (i.e. Av, which is the month of the Zodiac Leo), he could not be appeased, since the fifth [lunar month] is called Arieh (i.e. a play on words, meaning the Zodiac Leo in the Hebrew tongue, active in the fifth lunar month, but also meaning lion in Hebrew), as it says: ‘A lion has gone up from his thicket,’ etc. (Jer. 4:7) and he has destroyed the Temple that is called Arieh, as it says: ‘Ah, Ariel, Ariel!’ (Isa. 29:1), and he has smitten Israel who is called Ariel (lit. ‘lion of God’), as it says: ‘[behold, the people]…as a lion it lifts itself’ (Num. 23:24), during a month that is called Ariel (lit. ‘Ari [lion] of God’), [meaning], on account of its having cancelled the words of Ariel (i.e. descriptive name for God), as it says: ‘[The lion has roared]; who will not fear?’ (Amos 3:8)" (End quote)) For this reason, the use of the rabbinic dictum, "When Av ushers-in, happiness is diminished" (Hebrew: משנכנס אב ממעטין בשמחה), is commonly heard in the mouths of the Jewish people. The month is marked by the Ninth of Av (Tisha B'Av) fast day. During the same lunar month and its astral influences, the Jewish populous of Betar met their destruction under the Emperor Hadrian in the 2nd-century CE.
- King Edward I of England issued his decree (Edict of Expulsion) on 18 July, in the year 1290 CE (a date corresponding with the 9th-day of the lunar month Av when the month's influences were under the sign of the Zodiac Leo), that all Jews in his kingdom will be expelled from the country, and whosoever remained in the country beyond November of that same year would be executed.
- The outbreak of World War I began on 28 July, 1914 (a date corresponding with the 5th-day of the lunar month Av when the month's influences were under the sign of the Zodiac Leo); the Austro-Hungarian Empire having then declared war on Serbia. On the 7th-day of the lunar month Av, Russia joined the war. On the 9th-day of the lunar month Av, Germany joined the war.

== Kabbalah ==
The Kabbalist and rabbi Hayyim ben Joseph Vital explained the seven classical planets in a more conceptual and esoteric sense. While ranking ten spheres (realms) (Hebrew: גלגלים) from the highest to the lowest, he describes the Ninth Sphere as having nothing in it, and which rejects the presence of any star. As for the Eighth Sphere (Hebrew: גלגל השמיני), he states that all the stars of the universe, with the 12 constellations of the Zodiac, are contained therein, being below the Ninth Sphere, while each of the Seven classical planets occupies a space or realm below them: In the Seventh Sphere there is only one planet, Saturn (shabtai); in the Sixth Sphere there is only one planet, Jupiter (tzedek); in the Fifth Sphere there is only one planet, Mars (ma'adim); in the Fourth Sphere there is only one star, the Sun (ḥamah); in the Third Sphere there is only one planet, Venus (nogah); in the Second Sphere there is only one planet, Mercury; and in the First Sphere there is only the Moon (levanah). Hayyim Vital does not speak about their physical distance in relation to the earth, seeing that, besides the Moon (a satellite), the planet Venus is the closest planet, physically, to the earth. Rather, everything is expressed in relative spiritual distances, by virtue of their rank.

Hayyim Vital, when speaking of their relative influences, wrote: "It has already been explained in the books on the science of astrology that all the changing occurrences which take place and which appear anew in the world, they are in accordance with the encounter of one of the Seven Planets standing in proximity to a certain star (Hebrew: מזל) of the twelve astrological constellations (Hebrew: מזלות) located in the Eighth Sphere, or else in accordance with the encounter of some of those planets which belong to the Seven, when they are found together in one place. Moreover, any encounter of the Seven Planets with the other [celestial] forms found in the [vast] open space of the Eighth Sphere (Note: And which are not part of the stars making-up the 12 Zodiac constellations.) will cause a little of the instructions [relegated unto it] to surge, although not with the same vigor as in the place of those twelve astrological constellations that are synchronous with the Eighth Sphere."

One of the more arcane and mystical writings on the subject, Sefer Yetzirah "Book of Creation", a book that endeavors to show the interconnection between all things, says that God created the classical planets by means of seven Hebrew letters, which are בג"ד כפר"ת (being the sole double-sounding consonants in the Hebrew alphabet), and that the 12 constellations of the Zodiac were also created by means of 12 ordinary Hebrew letters. The author of this work, without divulging the influences of the horoscopes, names simply those things created by means of the letters, naming also the weekdays, seven groupings of words and their opposites (life and death; peace and evil disturbances; wisdom and foolishness; wealth and poverty; fertility and desolation; beauty and ugliness; governance and servitude), among other things. According to Judah Halevi, the seven planets and the 12 constellations, and the various other examples mentioned in the book, are the means by which man is capable of understanding the unity and omnipotence of God, which are multiform on one side and, yet, uniform on the other.

== Fatalism ==
While astrology in Jewish thought is generally acknowledged to mean that "every happening related to man, whether small or great, has been delivered into the power of the stars by the blessed Creator," it still allows for self-determination and free will of the individual in what concerns his choice of right and wrong actions, in spite of fate governing other aspects of man's life. This is expressed by the rabbinic dictum: "Everything is determined by heaven, except one's fear of heaven," meaning, everything in a person's life is predetermined by God —except that person's choice to be either good or bad; righteous or wicked, which is left up entirely to his own free will. Under this principle, as articulated by 13th-century rabbinic scholar, Menachem Meiri, a man that is born under the influences of Mars will have a default inclination to shed blood, and if he were the son of a king born under the same Martian influence, he will grow-up to wage wars on other countries, and when victorious, he will sentence the defeated enemy to be executed. Even so, an ordinary man that is born under such influences should be instructed to take-up the profession of ritual slaughter, or livestock butcher, or similar skill crafts (e.g. mohel, surgeon). So, too, with all the other signs of the Zodiac which incline to a certain unwanted trait, man is able to choose between right and wrong, and between good and bad.

In some instances, a person can alter what has been seen by an astrologer concerning his fate, simply by performing a charitable deed. The Jerusalem Talmud relates a story where two men were saved by giving a portion of their bread to a hungry man. In other cases, a person's fortune may be altered by a change of place or by a change of name. Rabbi and philosopher Joseph Albo (c. 1380–1444) wrote in his Sefer ha-Ikkarim that "the stars determine the destiny at some point, but can be changed by free will or merit."

== See also ==
- Beth Alpha – Astrological symbols found at Beth Alpha synagogue
- Hebrew astronomy
- Hebrew calendar
- Jewish views on astrology
- Mazzaroth
- Relative hour
- Western astrology
- Zodiac
- Zodiac mosaics in ancient synagogues

== Bibliography ==
- Adani, David ben Amram (1975). Fisch, Solomon (ed.). Midrash HaGadol (in Hebrew). Vol. 5 (Deuteronomy) (2 ed.). Jerusalem: Ben-Zvi Institute. OCLC 233160756., s.v. Deuteronomy 4:19
- Adani, Samuel ben Joseph (1997). "Concise rules of astrology (chapter 17)". Sefer Naḥalat Yosef (in Hebrew). Ramat-Gan: Makhon Nir David. OCLC 31818927. (reprinted from Jerusalem editions, 1907, 1917 and 1988)
- Bar-Sheshet, Isaac (1993). David Metsger (ed.). Questions & Responsa of Rabbi Isaac Bar-Sheshet (Sheʼelot u-teshuvot) (in Hebrew). Vol. 1. Jerusalem: Mekhon Or ha-mizraḥ, Mekhon Yerushalayim. OCLC 28764985., responsum no. 118
- Bennett, Jeffrey; Donohue, Megan; Schneider, Nicholas; Voit, Mark (2007). The cosmic perspective (4th ed.). San Francisco, CA: Pearson/Addison-Wesley. ISBN 978-0-8053-9283-8.
- Djokić, Dejan (2003). Yugoslavism: histories of a failed idea, 1918–1992. London: Hurst. OCLC 51093251.
- Donnolo, Sabbatai (1881). David Castelli (ed.). Sefer Ḥakhmoni (in Hebrew). Firenze (Florence): Le Monnier. pp. 71–72. OCLC 162802215.
- Encyclopaedia Judaica (1973), "Astrology", Encyclopaedia Judaica, vol. 3 (Anh-Az), Jerusalem: Keter Publishing House, Ltd., pp. 788–795, OCLC 64144745
- Friedlander, Gerald, ed. (1916). Pirḳê de Rabbi Eliezer. Translated by Gerald Friedlander. London: Kegan Paul, Trench, Trubner & Co. OCLC 10912401.
- Giat, Paltiel (2003). A Word in Stone: Zippori in the Sages Literature (Milah be-even: Zippori basifrut chazal) (in Hebrew). Jerusalem: Israel Nature & National Parks Authority, and The Department for Torah Culture in the Ministry of Education. OCLC 58417078.
- Ha-Kohen, Isaac ben Samson, ed. (1968). Midrash Shoher Tov (Midrash Tillim) (in Hebrew). Jerusalem: Midrash. OCLC 30745846., s.v. Psalm 19
- Maimonides, Moses (1956). Guide for the Perplexed. Translated by Michael Friedländer (2nd ed.). New York: Dover Publishers. OCLC 318937112.
- Maimonides (1965). Mishnah, with Maimonides' Commentary (in Hebrew). Vol. 2. Translated by Yosef Qafih. Jerusalem: Mossad Harav Kook. OCLC 233308346.
- Maimonides (1974). Sefer Mishneh Torah – HaYad Ha-Chazakah (Maimonides' Code of Jewish Law) (in Hebrew). Vol. 1. Jerusalem: Pe'er HaTorah. OCLC 122758200.
- Maimonides (1978), "Iggeret Teiman (Epistle to Yemen)", Letters and Responsa (Igrot u-teshuvot (in Hebrew), Levin-Epstein, OCLC 1268439691
- Meiri (2006). Daniel Bitton (ed.). Beit HaBechirah (Chiddushei ha-Meiri) (in Hebrew). Vol. 1. Jerusalem: Hamaor Institute. OCLC 181631040., Shabbat 156a, s.v. מפנות הדת
- Morris, Marc (2009). A Great and Terrible King: Edward I and the Forging of Britain. London, UK: Windmill Books. ISBN 978-0-09-948175-1.
- Nahmanides (1993). Nahmanides' Commentary on the Torah (punctuated) (in Hebrew). Vol. 2. Jerusalem: A. Blum. OCLC 233074002.
- Nethanel ben Isaiah (1983). Sefer Me'or ha-Afelah (in Hebrew). Translated by Yosef Qafih. Kiryat Ono: Mechon Moshe. OCLC 970925649.
- Pesikta de-Rav Kahana (1949). Salomon Buber (ed.). Pesikta de-Rav Kahana. New York: Mekitze Nirdamim. OCLC 122787256.
- Pesikta Rabbati (n.d.). Meir Ish Shalom of Vienna (ed.). Midrash Pesikta Rabbati (in Hebrew). Israel: not identified. OCLC 249274973. (reprinted from 1880 edition)
- Pirke Rabbi Eliezer (1983). Pirkei De-Rabbi Eliezer (in Hebrew). Jerusalem: Eshkol. OCLC 754754890.
- Saadia (1972). Yosef Qafih (ed.). Sefer Yetzirah (Kitāb al-mabādī), with a Translation and Commentary by Rabbi Saadia Gaon (in Hebrew). Jerusalem: Committee for the publication of Rabbi Saadia Gaon's books (in affiliation with the American Academy of Jewish Studies). OCLC 319752519.
- Sar-Shalom, Rahamim (1984). She'harim La'Luah Ha'ivry (Gates to the Hebrew Calendar) (in Hebrew). Tel-Aviv. p. 126 (The Zodiac). OCLC 854906532.
- Sela, Shlomo (2006). "Abraham Bar Ḥiyya's Astrological Work and Thought". Jewish Studies Quarterly. 13 (2). Mohr Siebeck GmbH & Co. KG: 128–158. doi:10.1628/094457006777412278. JSTOR 40753395.
- Taylor, Alan John Percivale (1998). The First World War and its aftermath, 1914–1919. Century of Conflict, 1848–1948. London: Folio Society. OCLC 49988231.
- Vital, Hayyim (1866). Sefer Ha-tekhunah (ספר התכונה) (in Hebrew). Jerusalem: Israel Beck. OCLC 1282064644.
- Zarka, Philippe (2011). "Astronomy and astrology". Proceedings of the International Astronomical Union. 5 (S260): 420–425. Bibcode:2011IAUS..260..420Z. doi:10.1017/S1743921311002602.
- Zechariah ha-Rofé (1990). Havazelet, Meir (ed.). Midrash ha-Ḥefetz (in Hebrew). Vol. 1. Jerusalem: Mossad Harav Kook. OCLC 23773577.
- Zechariah ha-Rofé (1992). Havazelet, Meir (ed.). Midrash ha-Ḥefetz (in Hebrew). Vol. 2. Jerusalem: Mossad Harav Kook. OCLC 23773577.
