= Isaac Israeli ben Joseph =

14th-century Spanish-Jewish astronomer

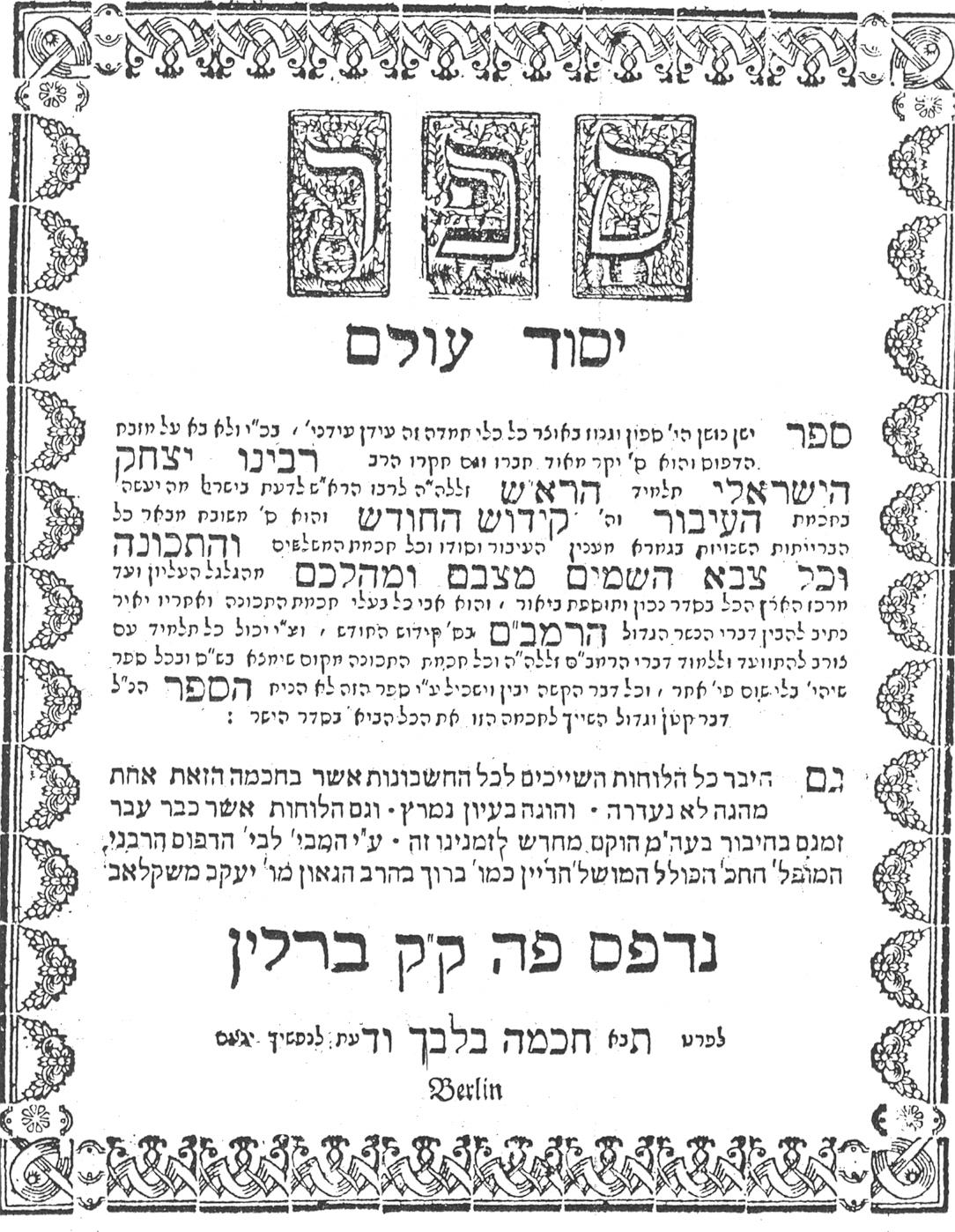
Yesod Olam

Isaac Israeli ben Joseph or Yitzhak ben Yosef (often known as Isaac Israeli the Younger) was a Spanish-Jewish astronomer/astrologer who flourished at Toledo in the first half of the fourteenth century.

He was a pupil of Asher ben Yehiel, at whose request (in 1310) he wrote the astronomical work Yesod Olam. The book includes chapters on: geometry and trigonometry; the structure and position of the globe; the number and movements of celestial spheres; the time differences in days and nights in various parts of the Earth; the movements of sun and moon; solstices, neomeniæ, eclipses, and leap-years. It also contains astronomical tables (ephemeris) and a perpetual calendar. It also deals with the chronological systems of other nations and religions (iv, § 17), especially Christianity, and lists notable personages of the Biblical, Talmudic, and geonic periods, as per Sefer ha-Qabbalah of Abraham ibn Daud, in chronological order (iv, § 18). This last was included by Zacuto in his Sefer ha-Yuḥasin.

The Yesod Olam was first published in Berlin by Jacob Shklower in 1777. A more complete edition, with a preface by David Cassel, was published by B. Goldberg and L. Rosenkranz (1848). Israeli's work was much studied in the Middle Ages. Isaac al-Hadib, Judah Bassan, and Elijah Mizrahi annotated it, and an anonymous author wrote a commentary on it (Neubauer, Cat. Bodl. Hebr. MSS. Nos. 2044, 746, 5). An abridgment was made in Arabic by the author's son Joseph Israeli ben Isaac, of which the Hebrew translation, Kitzur Yesod Olam is still extant (ib. No. 1319, 6).

Israeli was also the author of two other astronomical works, Sha'ar ha-Shamayim and Sha'ar ha-Milu'im, both extant in manuscript (ib. No. 2046).

Israeli apologizes for citing non-Jewish authors and claims that the ancient sages also possessed this knowledge before the destruction of the First Temple.

== See also ==
- Hebrew astronomy
