= Isaac Israeli =

Isaac Israeli may refer to:

- Isaac Israeli ben Solomon, ninth-century Jewish physician and scientist
- Isaac Israeli ben Joseph, fourteenth-century Jewish astronomer
