= Mazzaroth =

Biblical term for the Zodiac

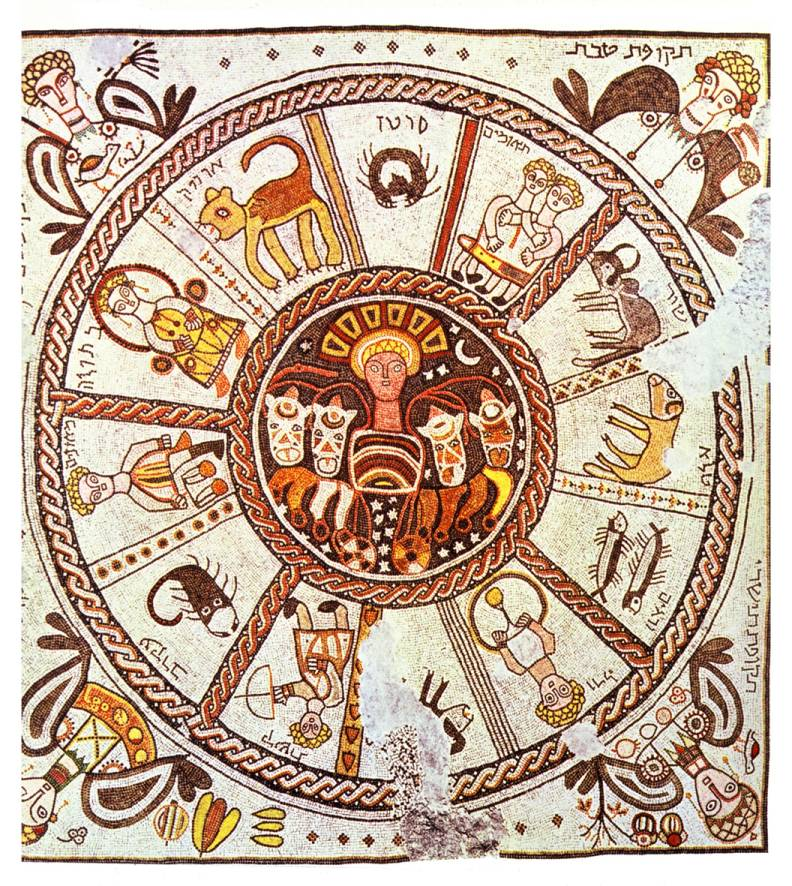
Helios-zodiac cycle, 6th-century mosaic in the Beth Alpha Synagogue, Israel

Mazzaroth (Hebrew: מַזָּר֣וֹת, mazzārōṯ, LXX Μαζουρωθ, Mazourōth) is a Biblical Hebrew word found in the Book of Job (Job 38:32) whose precise meaning is uncertain. Its context is that of astronomical constellations, and some judge it to mean a specific constellation, while it is often interpreted as a term for the zodiac or the constellations thereof. The similar word mazalot (מַּזָּלוֹת) in 2 Kings 23:3–5 may be related.

According to 10th-century biblical exegete Saadia Gaon, it literally means "constellations," while others interpret the word as naming various concrete astronomic bodies - Saturn, the seven planets, the Hyades, the Northern and Southern Crowns, the Southern Ship (Argo Navis?) or Sirius.

The word itself is a hapax legomenon (i.e., a word appearing only once in a text) of the Hebrew Bible. In Yiddish, the term mazalot came to be used in the sense of "astrology" in general, surviving in the expression "mazel tov," meaning "good fortune."

== Biblical context ==
The appearance of the word in the Job 38:31-2 appears in the context of various astronomical phenomena: "31 Can you tie cords to Pleiades / Or undo the reins of Orion? 32 Can you lead out Mazzaroth in its season, / Conduct the Bear with her sons?"

The related word mazzālot (מַזָּלוֹת) in 2 Kings 23:5 may have a different meaning, and is often translated differently, with the linkage of this word to the classical planets or the zodiac being more widely held; in Kabbalistic astrology, mazzālot was also used for astrology in general, and the word may be related to Assyrian manzaltu "lunar station"):

4 The king stood by the pillar and solemnized the covenant before GOD: that they would follow GOD and observe God’s commandments, injunctions, and laws with all their heart and soul; that they would fulfill all the terms of this covenant as inscribed upon the scroll. And all the people entered into the covenant. 4 Then the king ordered the high priest Hilkiah, the priests of the second rank, and the guards of the threshold to bring out of the Temple of GOD all the objects made for Baal and Asherah and all the host of heaven. He burned them outside Jerusalem in the fields of Kidron, and he removed the ashes to Bethel. 5 He suppressed the idolatrous priests whom the kings of Judah had appointed to make offerings at the shrines in the towns of Judah and in the environs of Jerusalem, and those who made offerings to Baal, to the sun and moon and constellations—all the host of heaven.

The Septuagint, however, uses the transliteration mazouroth (Koine Greek: μαζουρωθ) in this same passage (4 Kingdoms 23): "5 καὶ κατέκαυσε τοὺς χωμαρίμ, οὓς ἔδωκαν βασιλεῖς ᾿Ιούδα καὶ ἐθυμίων ἐν τοῖς ὑψηλοῖς καὶ ἐν ταῖς πόλεσιν ᾿Ιούδα καὶ τοῖς περικύκλῳ ῾Ιερουσαλήμ, καὶ τοὺς θυμιῶντας τῷ Βάαλ καὶ τῷ ἡλίῳ καὶ τῇ σελήνῃ καὶ τοῖς μαζουρὼθ καὶ πάσῃ τῇ δυνάμει τοῦ οὐρανοῦ."

== Translation ==
The word is traditionally (following LXX) left untranslated (ABC, ACV, AKJ, ASV, BBE, BIB, ESV, GNV, HNV, JPS, K21, KJG, KJR, KJV, NAB, NKJ, NRS, NWT, RSV, RWB, TMB, TNK, UPD, WEB, YLT, LXE, ZIK), but some modern English Bible translations render it as "zodiac" (AMP, CJB, EMP, LEE); others have "constellations" (CJB, CSB, DBY, NET, ERV, GWN, LEE, LIT, MKJ, NAS, NAU, NIB, NIV, TNV, WEV) or "stars" (CEV, NCB, NIR, NLV, TEV).

But as the Latin Vulgate renders the word as "luciferum", there are alternative English translations as "morning star" (CVB, TRC, furthermore Luther's 1545 German translation as Morgenstern also means "morning star"; (DRA); "Venus" (MSG); "Crown season" (NJB); "sequence of seasons" (NLT); "Lucifer, 'that is, dai sterre (day star)" (Wycliffe's Bible). WES gives "stars in the southern signs".

Translators' Notes given in individual translations are:

- Geneva: Certain stars so called, some think they were the twelve signs.
- KJV/KGB: {Mazzaroth: or, the twelve signs}
- NAS/NAU: perh. "a constellation"
- NET: The word מַּזָּלֹות; (mazzarot) is taken by some to refer to the constellations (see 2 Kings 23:5), and by others as connected to the word for "crown," and so "corona."
- NIB/NIV: {32 Or the morning star in its season}

The Targum renders the translation as "guards of the mazalot".

Rashi clarifies mazzarot as "all the gates of the mazalot".

== In Gnosticism ==
Lofts (2010) connects Mazareus (part of the name of the Sethian figure Yesseus Mazareus Yessedekeus) with Mazzaroth.

== See also ==
- Biblical names of stars
- Biblical astronomy
- Christian views on astrology
- Hebrew astronomy
- Jewish astrology
- Jewish views on astrology
- Zodiac synagogue mosaic
