= Abraham ben Eliezer Halevi =

Sephardic rabbi and kabbalist (born c. 1460)

Personal life
- Born: Abraham Ben Eliezer Ha-Levi c. 1460 Toledo, Castille
- Died: after 1528 Jerusalem, Ottoman Empire
- Parent: Rabbi Eliezer HaLevi (father)

Religious life
- Religion: Judaism
- Main work: Masoret ha-Hokhmah, Mashreh Kitrin, Ma'amar Perek Ḥelek, Iggeret Sod ha-Ge'ullah

Rabbi Abraham ben Eliezer Halevi the Elder (Hebrew: רבי אברהם בן אליעזר הלוי הזקן; c. 1460 - after 1528) was a Sephardic rabbi and kabbalist known for his apocalyptic treatises on Kabbalah and his beliefs regarding messianism. He was also an early member of the Old Yishuv, immigrating to Jerusalem in 1514.

== Biography ==
Born in Toledo, Spain, to a distinguished family. In his early years, he studied under Rabbi Isaac Gakon. While in Spain, he wrote several kabbalistic treatises, the most famous of which is "Masoret ha-Hokhmah" a brief account of Spanish Kabbalism which he finished shortly before the Expulsion of Jews from Spain in 1492. After said expulsion, Rabbi Abraham lived in Portugal for a short time, where he published "Meshare Qitrin". It was also during this time that he became affiliated with Abraham Zacuto (who was his brother in law) and Isaac Abrabanel and was influenced by apocalyptic sentiment popularized after the Spanish inquisition. Like many of his contemporaries, he believed that the year 1524 would be the beginning of the messianic era and that the Messiah himself would appear in 1530–31. This belief became an obsession for Rabbi Abraham, who would spend countless years searching for proof in the Bible and the Talmud as well as in kabbalistic literature. He left Portugal and briefly settled in Greece where he wrote the treatise "Mashreh Kitrin", an apocalyptic explanation of the Book of Daniel. The work was printed in Istanbul in 1510 and was one of the earliest printed Hebrew books. In 1514 he immigrated to Jerusalem alongside Isaac Hakohen Sholal. In Jerusalem, he became widely known and respected through his literary and religious activities. In Jerusalem he wrote "Ma'amar Perek Ḥelek", an explanation of talmudic statements in tractate Sanhedrin relating to messianism.

Rabbi Abraham viewed Martin Luther in a good light, as he believed him to be a component of the Messianic era, seeing Martin Luther as the destroyer of the Christian faith. In 1521, Rabbi Abraham wrote "Iggeret Sod ha-Ge'ullah", in which he interpreted the Zohar, relating it back to his Messianic beliefs. Various other kabbalistic writings of Rabbi Abraham have been preserved, including "Ma'amar ha-Yiḥud" and "Megillat Amrafel". In 1528 Rabbi Abraham wrote to the Beta Israel, marking one of the earliest correspondences between them and European Jews. Rabbi Abraham must have died between 1529 and 1535, as in 1535 David ben Solomon mentions Rabbi Abraham being dead for a long time.
