= José Vizinho =

15th-century Portuguese court physician and scientist

José Vizinho, (also known in English as Joseph Vecinho), was a Portuguese Jew, born in the town of Covilhã, court physician and scientist at the end of the fifteenth century.

He was a pupil of Abraham Zacuto, with whom he studied mathematics and cosmography, and was regarded as an authority on the subject by King John II of Portugal. He was sent by the king to the Gulf of Guinea in 1483, to measure the altitude of the sun, using an astrolabe improved by Jacob ben Machir. This was one of several voyages that resulted in the production of detailed maps of areas of the eastern Atlantic that had been unknown to Europeans until then.

In 1484, Christopher Columbus presented his plans to the king for a western route to the Indies, which was evaluated by a committee of experts headed by Martin Behaim and "Mestre José", as José Vizinho was called, and also including the Bishop of Ceuta, the court physician Rodrigo, and a Jewish mathematician named Moisés. The Committee finally decided against Columbus' plans to sail west across the Atlantic to the Indies, correctly judging that Columbus had seriously underestimated the size of the world. When the matter came up before the council of state, Pedro de Menezes opposed them also, basing his arguments on José Vizinho's criticisms. Although Vizinho had not favored Columbus' plan, Columbus interacted with him, and obtained a translation of Zacuto's astronomical tables from him. Columbus carried this translation with him on his voyage, and found it extremely useful; it was found in his library after his death.

José Vizinho's translation of Zacuto's tables was published by the Jewish printer Samuel d'Ortas in Leiria under the title "Almanach Perpetuum," 1496.
