= Isaac ibn al-Ahdab =

Jewish mathematician and astronomer

Itzḥak ben Shlomo ibn al-Aḥdab (or ibn al-Ḥadib) ben Tzaddiq ha-Sefardi (Hebrew: יצחק בן שלמה בן צדיק אלאחדב הספרדי, c. 1350 – c. 1426) was a Jewish mathematician, astronomer, and poet.

Ibn al-Aḥdab was born in Castile to a prominent Jewish family. He was a student of Judah ben Asher II, the great-grandson of Asher ben Yeḥiel of Cologne, who was killed in the anti-Jewish massacres of 1391. By 1396 Ibn al-Aḥdab had fled Spain and was in Sicily, where he lived (in Syracuse and Palermo) until his death around 1426.

== Work ==
He studied the algebra of Maghrebi mathematician Ibn al-Bannā and published The Epistle of the Number, a translation and detailed commentary on Ibn al-Bannā's 13th century treatise Talḵīṣ ʿAmal al-Ḥisāb ("A summary of the operations of calculation"). The work is notable in being the first known Hebrew-language treatise to include extensive algebraic theories and operations.

His astronomical works include Oraḥ selulah (Upraised Path), a set of tables in Hebrew for conjunctions and oppositions of the Sun and the Moon, Keli Ḥemdah (Precious Instrument), which describes a unique equatorium of his own invention, functioning on the Ptolemaic theory of epicycles, and Keli Memutsa (Intermediate Instrument), which describes another unique instrument of his own design, a combination astrolabe-quadrant. Bernard R. Goldstein published a partial translation of Keli Ḥemdah in 1987. Oraḥ selulah survives in 25 MSS, Keli Ḥemdah in 15 MSS, and Keli Memutsa in 1 MS.

He is the author of a commentary on the Passover Haggadah, titled Pesach Doros (Passover of later generations) and printed by Mekhon Bet Aharon ṿe-Yiśraʼel in 2000.

Leshon ha-Zahav (Golden Language), an explication of the names for units and measurements found in the Hebrew Bible.

He is probably the author of a commentary on Maimonides' Laws of the Sanctification of the Month, found in the same MS as Leshon ha-Zahav with no author given.

He also wrote songs, published as Shirei Rabbeinu Itzḥak ben Shlomo ibn al-Aḥdab (1987). He is known to have composed a work called Shir ha-Shirim, but it has not survived.
