= Abraham Zacuto =

Spanish Jewish astronomer and rabbi (1452 – c.1515)

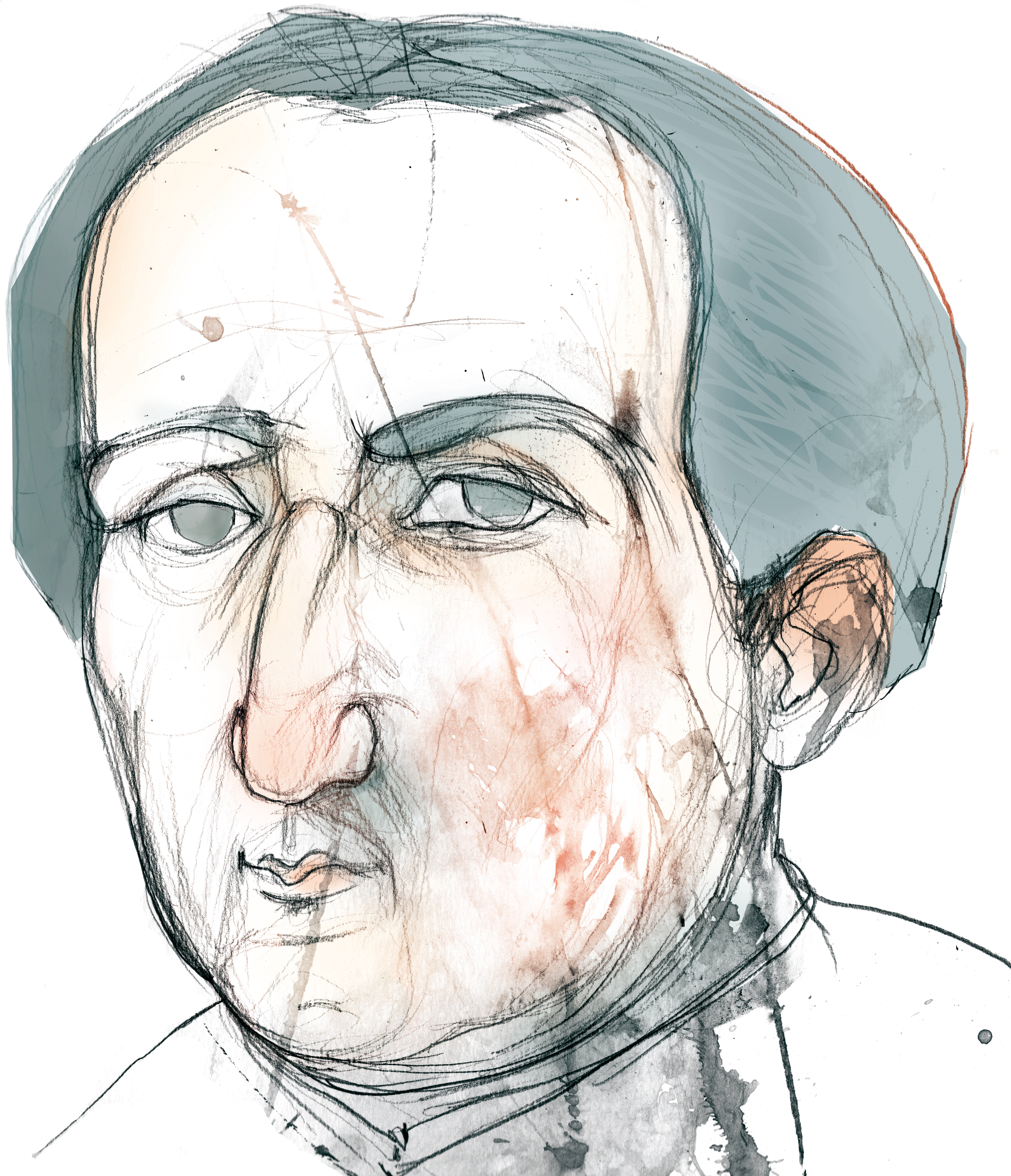
- Portrait of Abraham Zacut. Spanish Foundation for Science and Technology, Eulogia Merle.
- Born: 12 August 1452; Salamanca, Kingdom of Castile and León
- Died: 1515 (aged 62–63); Jerusalem or Damascus, Mamluk Sultanate

Abraham Zacuto (Hebrew: אַבְרָהָם בֵּן שְׁמוּאֵל זַכּוּת, romanized: Avraham ben Shmuel Zacut, Portuguese: Abraão ben Samuel Zacuto; 12 August 1452 – c. 1515) was a Sephardic Jewish astronomer, astrologer, mathematician, rabbi and historian. Born in Castile, he served as Royal Astronomer to King John II of Portugal before fleeing to Tunis.

His astrolabe of copper, astronomical tables, and maritime charts played an important role in the Spanish and Portuguese voyages of discovery, being used by both Vasco Da Gama and Christopher Columbus.

== Life ==
Zacuto was born in Salamanca, Castile in 1452. He may have studied and taught astronomy at the University of Salamanca. He later taught astronomy at the universities of Zaragoza and then Carthage. He was well versed in Jewish Law, and was the rabbi of his community. Zacuto was actually Abraham Zacuto III, his ancestor the first was the author of the Sepher ha-Mishpotim in 1311, which today is in the library of the Jewish Theological Seminary in New York. He writes that his family had resided in Iberia since the expulsion of the Jews from France in 1306. His brother in law was the kabbalist, Rabbi Abraham ben Eliezer Halevi

With the Catholic Monarchs of Spain issuing the 1492 Alhambra Decree ordering the expulsion of the Jews, Zacuto took refuge in Lisbon, Portugal. Already famous in academic circles, he was invited to court and nominated Royal Astronomer and Historian by King John II of Portugal, a position which he held until the early reign of Manuel I. He was consulted by the king on the possibility of a sea route to India, a project which he supported and encouraged.

Zacuto was one of the few who managed to flee Portugal during the forced conversions and prohibitions of departure that the Portuguese king Manuel I enacted to keep the Jews in Portugal as nominal Christians for foreign policy reasons (see persecution of Jews and Muslims by Manuel I of Portugal). Zacuto first fled to Tunis and later moved to Jerusalem. He probably died in 1515 in Jerusalem; however, other reports indicate his final home was the Jewish community in Damascus and his death occurred in 1520. Though in a similar vein to other giants of the Jewish faith, such as Saadia Gaon, Maimonides and the Vilna Gaon, he followed the custom (believed to have begun in the Babylonian captivity) of being buried as close to Jerusalem as possible. Zacuto had announced his wish to make his death pilgrimage at a Passover gathering.

== Work ==
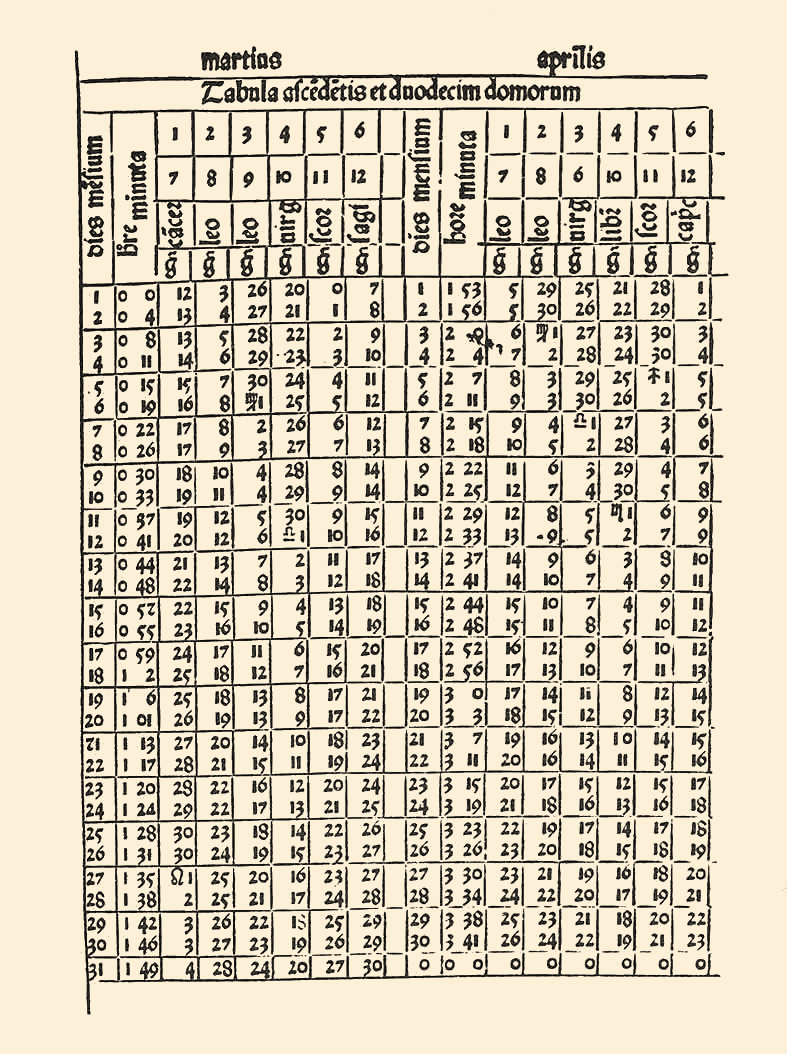
Page from Almanach Perpetuum

=== Ha-ḥibbur ha-gadol ===
Abraham Zacuto developed a new type of astrolabe, specialised for practical determination of latitude while at sea, in contrast to earlier multi-purpose devices intended for use ashore. Zacuto's principal claim to fame is the great astronomical treatise, written in Hebrew while he was in Salamanca, with the title Ha-ḥibbur ha-gadol ("The Great Book"). It was begun around 1470 and completed in 1478. It was composed of 65 detailed astronomical tables (ephemerides), with radix set for the year 1473 and with the meridian at Salamanca, charting the positions of the Sun, Moon and five planets. The calculations were based on the Alfonsine Tables and the works of earlier astronomers (notably of the 14th-century Majorcan school). Zacuto set out the data in a simple "almanac" format, with the positions of a planet easily interpolated between entries, making it quite easy to use.

The first Castilian translation was undertaken in 1481 by Juan de Salaya. Zacuto's Portuguese disciple Joseph Vizinus (Mestre José Vizinho, the much-valued physician and advisor of John II of Portugal) translated it into Latin, under the title Tabulae tabularum Celestium motuum sive Almanach perpetuum ("Book of Tables on the celestial motions or the Perpetual Almanac"), along with a new Castilian translation, and arranged for its publication in 1496 by Samuel d'Ortas in Leiria, Portugal. (one of the first books published in Portugal with a movable type printing press).

=== Biur luḥot ===
Zacuto's Almanach perpetuum (or Biur luḥot) revolutionised ocean navigation. Prior to the Almanach, navigators seeking to determine their position on the high seas had to correct for "compass error" (the deviation of the magnetic north from the true north) by recourse to the quadrant and the Pole Star. But this proved less useful as they approached the equator and the Pole Star began to disappear under the horizon. Zacuto's Almanach supplied the first accurate table of solar declination, allowing navigators to use the sun instead. As the quadrant could not be used to look directly at the sun, Portuguese navigators began using the astrolabe on board (an old land-based instrument to measure the height of the sun indirectly). Zacuto's tables in conjunction with the new metal nautical astrolabe allowed navigators to take accurate readings anywhere. Already in 1497, Vasco da Gama made use of Zacuto's tables and the astrolabe on his maiden trip to India. It continued to be used by Portuguese ships thereafter to reach far-off destinations such as Brazil and India.

Vasco da Gama and his crew underwent a thorough briefing and preparation by Zacuto. They learnt how to use the new instruments which he had developed for their trip before they set off on their voyage to India in 1496. Prior to that, Zacuto had further improved existing astronomical tables, mostly those prepared under King Alphonso X of Castille. Already Christopher Columbus had used Zacuto's tables. The story is that on one of his voyages, when attacked by the natives, Columbus noted that Zacuto had predicted an eclipse for that day, and used this information to threaten the natives and convince them that he could extinguish the Sun and Moon and deprive them of all light. Based on this story, Zacuto's work saved Columbus' life and that of his crew.

=== Sefer yuḥasin ===
In 1504, while in Tunisia, Abraham Zacuto wrote a history of the Jewish people, Sefer yuḥasin, starting with the Creation of the World and going to 1500, and several other astronomical/astrological treatises. The History was highly regarded and was reprinted in Cracow in 1581, in Amsterdam in 1717, and in Königsberg in 1857, while a complete, uncensored, edition was published by Herschell Filipowski in London in 1857.

== Legacy ==
Abraham Zacuto might have an uncredited appearance in Luís de Camões's 1572 epic poem, Os Lusíadas, as "the Old Man of Restelo", a Cassandra-like character that comes forward just before Vasco da Gama's departure to chide the vanity of fame and warn of the travails that await him (Canto IV, v.94-111). This may be Camões' poetic interpretation of an alleged meeting reported by Gaspar Correia between Vasco da Gama and the old Abraham Zacuto at a monastery near Belém beach just before his fleet's departure, in which Zacuto reportedly gave da Gama some final navigational tips and warned him of the dangers to avoid.

The small Abraham Zacuto Portuguese Jewish Museum (Portuguese: Museu Luso-Hebraico Abraão Zacuto), founded in 1939 and located in the former Synagogue of Tomar, is named after Zacuto.

The crater Zagut on the Moon is named after him.

== Novel ==
Abraham Zacuto appears as a historical character in Arkan Simaan's historical novel Le Neveu de Zacuto (Ancre de Marine, 2026, ISBN 978-2-84141-519-9)). The novel also features his fictional nephew Ithamar, a craftsman and astrolabe maker, and depicts the scientific environment of the Jewish community in Salamanca in the late fifteenth century. Through the family's story, the novel explores the expulsion of the Jews from Spain in 1492, their subsequent exile in Portugal and the persecution of Jewish communities in both kingdoms. The novel ends with the Lisbon massacre in 1506.

== Bibliography ==
- 1478, Ha-ḥibbur ha-gadol (La Compilación Magna), his first astronomical book, translated into Castilian 1481 by himself and Juan de Salaya from the University of Salamanca. In 1496 the work was translated into Latin translation by José Vizinho and published in Leira as Almanach Perpetuum or Tabule tabularum celestium motuum astronomi zacuti. This work became important for the contemporary explorers.
- 1486, Tratado breve en las ynfluencias del cielo, and De los eclipses del sol y la luna.
- 1498, Sefer yuḥasin, historical text for the Jewish people. Digital edition: Zacuto, Avraham. Sefer yuḥasin. Brooklyn, NY: Renaissance Hebraica, 1994.
- 1498, astrological text predicting that the Messiah would come in 1503/4.
- after 1498, Mishpetei ha-'istagnin (Judgments of the astrologer)
