= Tevet =

10th month of the Hebrew calendar

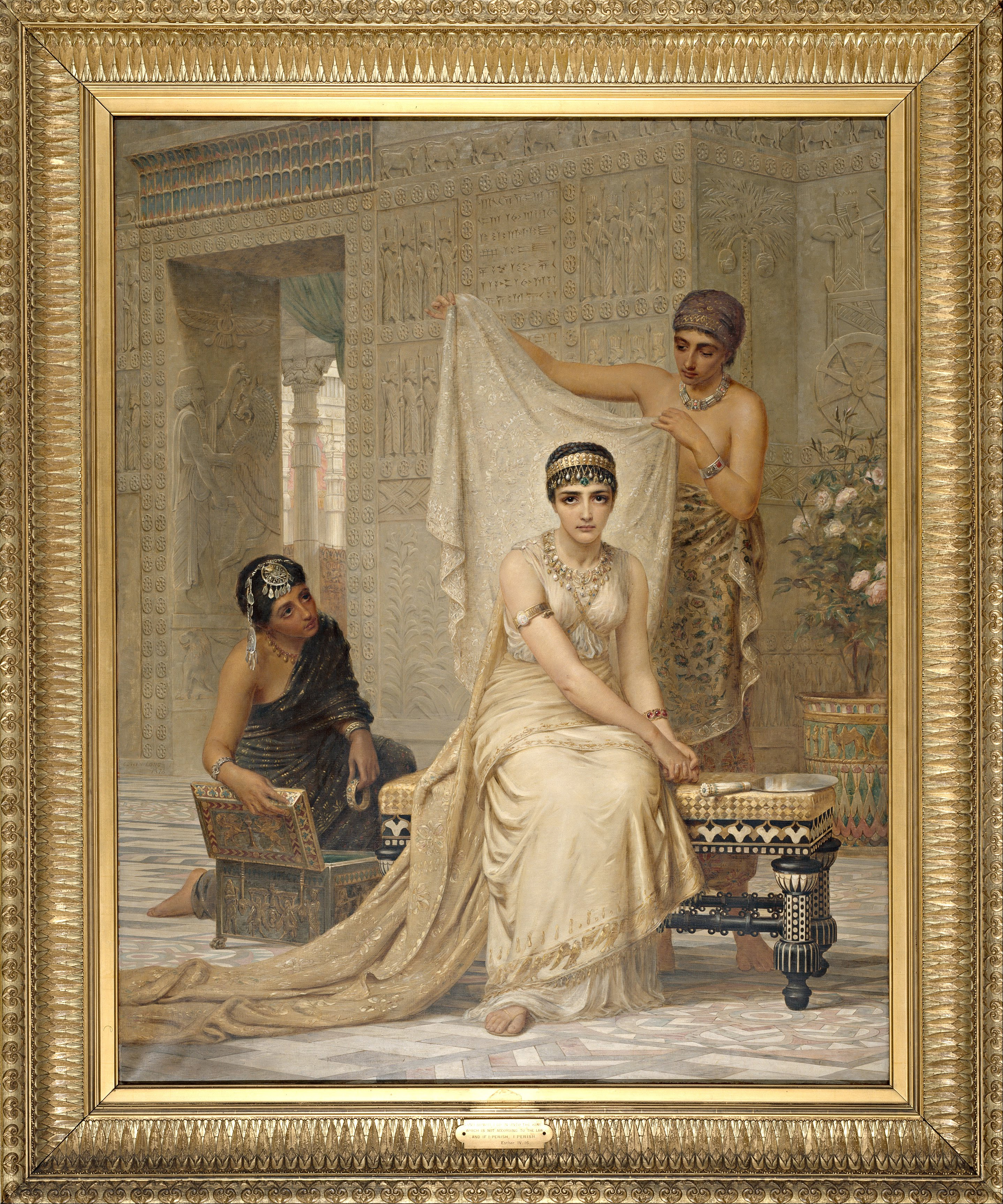
- On the 1st of Tevet, Esther was crowned Queen of Persia.
- Native name: טֵבֵת (Hebrew)
- Calendar: Hebrew calendar
- Month number: 10
- Number of days: 29
- Season: Winter (Northern Hemisphere)
- Gregorian equivalent: December–January
- Significant days: Hanukkah; Tenth of Tevet

Tevet (Hebrew: טֵבֵת, Standard Ṭevet; Tiberian Ṭēḇēṯ; from Akkadian ṭebētu) is the fourth month of the civil year and the tenth month of the ecclesiastical year on the Hebrew calendar. It follows Kislev and precedes Shevat. It is a month of 29 days. Tevet usually occurs in December–January on the Gregorian calendar. In the Babylonian calendar its name was Araḫ Ṭebētum, the "muddy month".

== Gregorian new year ==
The Gregorian New Year's Day (1 January) nearly always occurs in this month. Only rarely will it occur in either of the two neighbouring months (Kislev or Shevat).

== Holidays ==
- 25 Kislev – 2 Tevet – Hanukkah (or 3 Tevet if Kislev is short)
- 10 Tevet – Tenth of Tevet (Asara beTevet), a fast day

=== Community holidays ===
- 5 Tevet is celebrated as a holiday by Chabad Hasidim, commemorating the 1987 verdict concerning an inheritance claim on the books of Rabbi Joseph Isaac Schneersohn.

== In Jewish history and tradition ==
- 1 Tevet (circa 479 BC) – Esther was taken to King Achashverosh's palace, leading to her becoming queen (Book of Esther 2:16-17).
- 9 Tevet (1066) – The 1066 Granada massacre takes place, as a Muslim mob massacres 4,000 Jews throughout the city.
- 10 Tevet (588 BC) – Nebuchadnezzar II's armies besiege Jerusalem; now commemorated as a fast day.
- 10 Tevet (479 BC) – Esther appears before Achashverosh for the first time and is chosen by him to be the queen.
- 11 Tevet (decreed in 1669, enforced in 1670) – Jews were expelled from Vienna, Austria, during the reign of Holy Roman Emperor Leopold the First.
- 17 Tevet (1728) – Shearith Israel, the first New York synagogue, erects its first building in Lower Manhattan.
- 20 Tevet (1483) – The first volume of the Babylonian Talmud, the tractate Berachot, is printed in Soncino, Italy.
- 22 Tevet (1496) – Expulsion of Jews from Portugal, four years after the expulsion from Spain.
- 24 Tevet (3rd century BC) – Jewish elders procure the translation of the Hebrew Bible into Greek (Septuagint) for Ptolemy II Philadelphus.
- 24 Tevet (1812) - Death of the Alter Rebbe founder of the Chabad philosophy and author of the Tanya and Shulchan Aruch HaRav.
- 25 Tevet (1559) – Chovot HaLevavot published
- 25 Tevet (circa 332 BC) – Alexander the Great met the high priest after the Samaritans said the Jews intended to betray him.
- 28 Tevet (81 BC) – Shimon ben Shetach ejects the Sadducees from the Sanhedrin, replacing them with his Pharisaic disciples loyal to the Mishnah.

== See also ==
- Jewish astrology
