= Kislev =

9th month of the Hebrew calendar

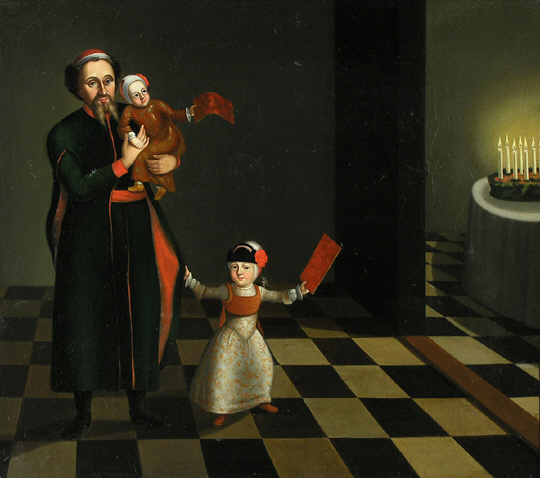
- Hanukkah, the Festival of Lights, begins on the 25th of Kislev.
- Native name: כִּסְלֵו (Hebrew)
- Calendar: Hebrew calendar
- Month number: 9
- Number of days: 29 or 30
- Season: Autumn (Northern Hemisphere)
- Gregorian equivalent: November–December
- Significant days: Hanukkah

Kislev or Chislev (Hebrew: כִּסְלֵו, Standard Kīslev Tiberian Kīslēw), is the third month of the civil year and the ninth month of the ecclesiastical year on the Hebrew calendar. In the Babylonian calendar its name was Kislimu.

In a regular (kesidran) year Kislev has 30 days, but because of the Rosh Hashanah postponement rules, in some years it can lose a day to make the year a "short" (chaser) year. Kislev is a month which occurs in November–December on the Gregorian calendar and is sometimes known as the month of dreams.

In Jewish Rabbinic literature, the month of Kislev is believed to correspond to the Tribe of Benjamin.

== Holidays ==
25 Kislev – 2 Tevet – Hanukkah – ends 3 Tevet if Kislev is short

== In Jewish history and tradition ==
- 3 Kislev (1917) - The Balfour Declaration is publicly released by the British government.
- 6 Kislev (1973) – Death of David Ben-Gurion
- 8 Kislev (1978) – Death of Golda Meir
- 9 Kislev (1773) – Birth of the Mitteler Rebbe, the second Chabad Rebbe.
- 9 Kislev (1827) – Death of the Mitteler Rebbe, the second Chabad Rebbe.
- 10 Kislev (1949) - The Knesset formally votes to designate Jerusalem as the capital of Israel.
- 14 Kislev (c. 1445 BCE) – Death of Reuben, son of Jacob.
- 14 Kislev (c. 1568 BCE) – Birth of Reuben, son of Jacob.
- 15 Kislev (167 BCE) – The Greeks set up the "Abomination of Desolation" in the Temple.
- 17 Kislev (1947) – The United Nations General Assembly approves Resolution 181 for the partition of Mandatory Palestine.
- 19 Kislev (1772) - Death of the Magid Of Mezritch, successor of the Baal Shem Tov.
- 19 Kislev (1798) – Liberation from prison of Rabbi Shneur Zalman of Liadi and celebrated as Yud Tes Kislev by Chabad Chassidim.
- 20 Kislev (c. 457 BCE) – Ezra addresses a three-day assemblage of Jews in Jerusalem, telling them to adhere to the Torah and to dissolve their interfaith marriages.
- 21 Kislev (c. 128 BCE) – The Samaritan temple at Mount Gerizim was destroyed by John Hyrcanus I.
- 25 Kislev (164 BCE) – The Hanukkah miracle
- 25 Kislev (167 BCE) The Greeks make pagan sacrifices in the Temple
- 27 Kislev (c. 2105 BCE) – Flood rains cease (According to Genesis 6–8).

== References in fiction ==
- In the story of Xenogears, Kislev is the name of a country, named after the Hebrew month.
- In the Dragonlance universe, Kislev (or Chislev) represents the godly force of instinct.
- By Jon Stewart in "Can I Interest You in Hanukkah" from Stephen Colbert's A Colbert Christmas: The Greatest Gift of All!

== See also ==
- Jewish astrology
