= Dikdukei Soferim =

Series of books written by Raphael Nathan Nota Rabinovicz

Diqduqē Soferim (Hebrew: דקדוקי סופרים) is the name of a series of books written by Raphael Nathan Nota Rabinovicz (d. 1888) that bring different textual variants of the Babylonian Talmud from the Munich Codex Hebraica 95, which was written in 1342. It is the only surviving manuscript covering the entire Talmud without Christian censorship. It is accompanied by comparisons to other manuscripts, old printings, and writings of the rishonim. It also includes notes that clarify the meaning of the different variants, and sometimes include the author's opinion of which is preferable.

Fifteen volumes of the series were published sequentially between 1867 and 1886. The author died in 1888, and the sixteenth volume was published postmortem in 1897, based on his notes. These 16 volumes do not cover the entire Talmud; a variety of more recent projects have attempted to complete the project for the remaining tractates.
