= Daniel Sperber =

British-born Israeli rabbi and academic

- דניאל שפרבר
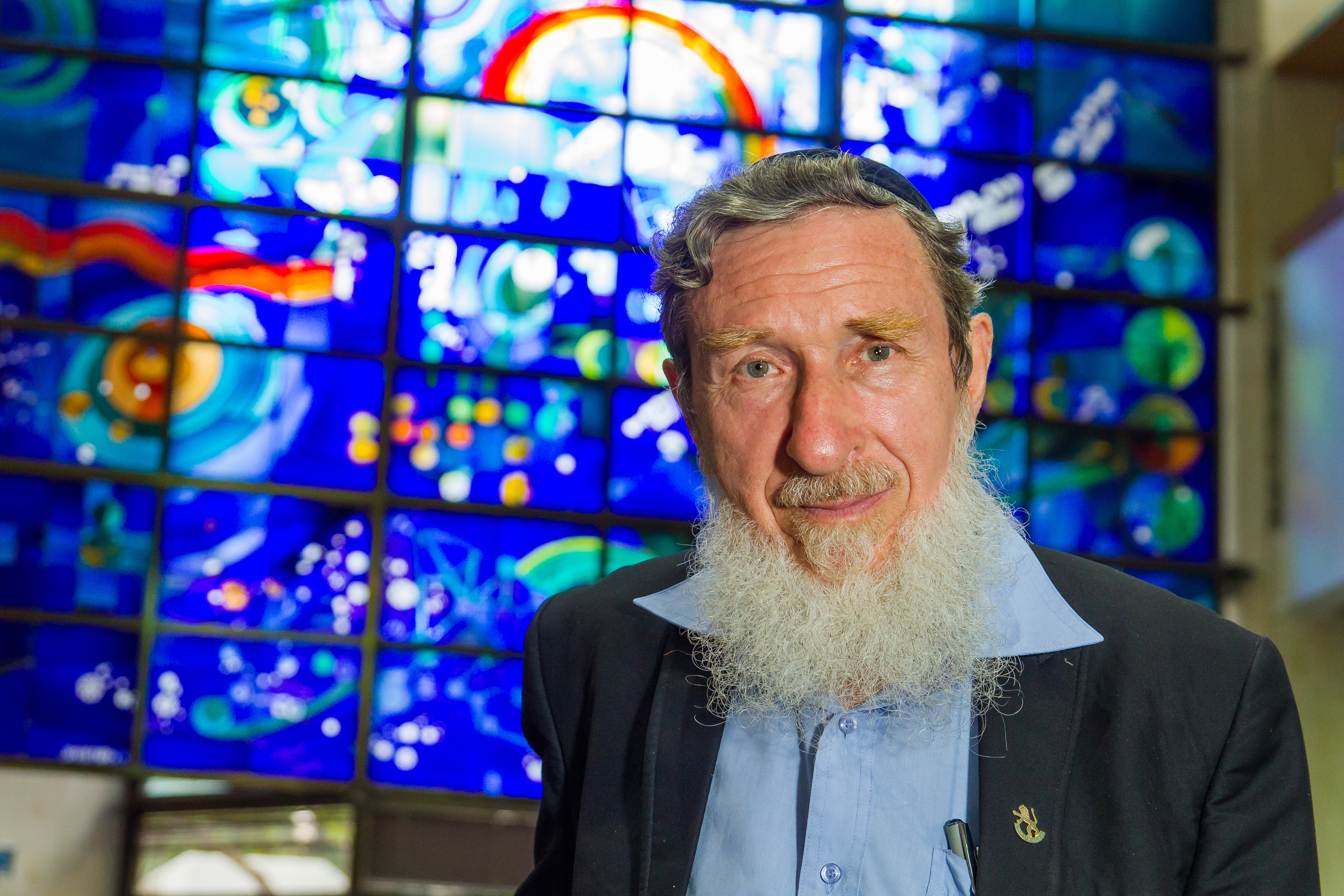
- Daniel Sperber
- Born: 4 November 1940 (age 85); Gwrych Castle, Wales, United Kingdom
- Occupations: Rabbi, professor
- Known for: Talmudic studies, Jewish customs, Jewish art history
- Awards: Israel Prize (1992)

Daniel Sperber (Hebrew: דניאל שפרבר; born 4 November 1940) is a British-born Israeli academic and Orthodox Jewish rabbi. He is a professor of Talmud at Bar-Ilan University in Israel, and an expert in classical philology, history of Jewish customs, Jewish art history, Jewish education, and Talmudic studies.

== Biography ==
Daniel Sperber was born in Gwrych Castle, Wales. He studied for rabbinical ordination at Yeshivat Kol Torah in Israel, earned a doctorate from University College, London, in the departments of Ancient History and Hebrew Studies.

He is married to Phyllis (Hannah) Magnus, a couples therapist, originally of Highland Park, Illinois. They have ten children. One of their daughters, Abigail, is the founder of Bat Kol, Israeli Jewish religious lesbian group.

== Academic and rabbinical career ==
He is the Milan Roven professor of Talmud at Bar-Ilan University in Israel, where he is also the President of the Ludwig and Erica Jesselson Institute for Advanced Torah Studies. He also served as rabbi of Menachem Zion Synagogue in the Old City of Jerusalem. In 2010, Sperber accepted an appointment as honorary Chancellor of the non-denominational Canadian Yeshiva & Rabbinical School in Toronto.

Sperber is the author of Minhagei Yisrael: Origins and History on the character and evolution of Jewish customs. He has written extensively on many issues regarding how Jewish law can evolve, and has evolved. This includes a call for a greater inclusion of women in certain ritual services, including ordination.

He has been critical of particular contemporary expressions of halachic observance. Regarding kitniyot, he has said, "The attitude in the last few decades has changed and become stricter, to the point of absurdity", pointing out that non-kitniyot items have been added to the list, including "cottonseed oil, sunflower oil, peanut oil, and even hemp".

Sperber explains his rationale for allowing a greater role for women in Orthodox practice: "The first is that in the same way it is forbidden to permit that which is forbidden, it's also forbidden to forbid that which is permitted. The second is that it is not forbidden to permit that which is permitted, even if it wasn't practiced in the past, because halakha is dynamic, and when cultural circumstances change, one has to face up to these changes and accommodate them. The third principle is that if you can find a position of leniency, you should do so. So, when things are permitted, they should be encouraged."

He has been condemned for not explaining the source of his personal authority to dislodge the views of prior voices in Jewish law, such as the Shulchan Aruch and the view of Maimonides, both of which are universally accepted in orthodox circles as the strongest, most authoritative halachic works.

== Awards and recognition ==
In 1992, Sperber won the Israel Prize, for Jewish studies.

== Published work ==
- Material Culture in Eretz Israel during the Talmudic Period, Vol. 1, Bar-Ilan University Press, 1993.
- Minhagei Yisrael: Origins and History. Mossad Harav Kook, 1998–2007, 8 vol..
- Masekhet Derekh erets zuṭa u-Fereḳ ha-shalom (3rd Edition) [in Hebrew], 1994. OCLC 31267940
- Magic and Folklore in Rabbinic Literature, Bar-Ilan University Press, 1994. ISBN 965-226-165-3
- Great is Peace, Jerusalem, 1979. OCLC 9368592
- Roman Palestine 200-400: Money and Prices, Bar-Ilan University Press, 1974; second edition with supplement 1991 . ISBN 965-226-147-5
- Daniel Sperber (1978). Roman Palestine, 200-400, the land : crisis and change in agrarian society as reflected in rabbinic sources. Ramat-Gan: Bar-Ilan University. OCLC 5222104.
- Daniel Sperber (1984). A dictionary of Greek and Latin legal terms in Rabbinic Literature. Ramat-Gan, Israel: Bar-Ilan University Press. ISBN 965-226-050-9.
- Nautica Talmudica, Bar-Ilan University Press and E.J. Brill, 1986. ISBN 90-04-08249-2
- A Commentary on Derech Eretz Zuta Chapters 5-8, Bar-Ilan University Press, 1990. OCLC 10107498
- Sperber, Daniel (1998). The City in Roman Palestine. Oxford Oxfordshire: Oxford University Press. ISBN 0-585-25475-3.
- Essays on Greek and Latin in the Mishna, Talmud and midrashic 1982
- David Sperber (1992). Re'ayot ha-Re'iyah : masot u-meḥḳarim be-torato shel ha-Rav Ḳuḳ. Yerushalayim: Bet ha-Rav. OCLC 34010082.
- Chana Sperber; Daniel Sperber; Jeffrey Allon (1995). Ten Best Jewish Children's Stories. New York: Pitspopany. ISBN 0-943706-58-0.
- Sperber, Daniel (1999). Why Jews Do What They Do. New York: Ktav Pub. House. ISBN 0-88125-604-8.
- Nautica in Talmudic Palestine. Mediterranean History Review, vol. 15, 2001
- Paralysis in Contemporary Halakhah? Tradition 36:3 (Fall 2002), 1-13.
- Tarbut Homrit Be'eretz Yisrael Beyemai Hatalmud (Material Culture in Eretz-Israel during the Talmudic Period), Vol. 2, Yad Yitzhak Ben Zvi & Bar Ilan University
- The Path of Halacha, Women Reading the Torah: A Case of Pesika Policy, Rubin Mass, Jerusalem, 2007 (Hebrew)
- Daniel Sperber (2002). Resh Kalah u-mai ḥupah. Yerushalayim. OCLC 57331845.
- Serber, Daniel (2010). On Changes in Jewish Liturgy: Options and Limitations. Jerusalem: Urim Publications. ISBN 978-965-524-040-5.
- The Jewish Life Cycle: Custom, Lore and Iconography—Jewish Customs from the Cradle to the Grave (Oxford UP and Bar-Ilan UP, Aug. 2008)
- Why Jews Do What They Do: The History of Jewish Customs Throughout the Cycle of the Jewish Year by Daniel Sperber and Yaakov Elman, (KTAV, Jan 1999).
- Women and Men in Communal Prayer: Halakhic Perspectives by Rabbi Professor Daniel Sperber, Rabbi Mendel Shapiro, Professor Eliav Shochetman and Rabbi Dr. Shlomo Riskin, (KTAV, 10 Mar 2010).
- Greek in Talmudic Palestine, Bar-Ilan University Press, 2012.
- Contributor to the Talmud El Am on Kiddushin.
- The Paths of Daniel: Studies in Judaism and Jewish Culture in Honor of Rabbi Professor Daniel Sperber Edited By: Adam S. Ferziger, Bar-Ilan University Press, 2017.

== See also ==
- List of Israel Prize recipients
