= Arnošt Zvi Ehrman =

Czech orthodox rabbi and editor

Arnošt Zvi Ehrman (1914–1976) was a Czech orthodox rabbi best known for his work as editor of the Talmud El Am. In addition, his contribution on Jewish law is evident in a number of articles and conference papers on the subject. Bernard Jackson wrote of "the debt that modern scholarship in Jewish law owes him".

== Biography ==
Ehrman was born in 1914 in Austria-Hungary (in what became Czechoslovakia in 1918). He studied at the Yeshiva in Kleinwardein (now Kisvárda, Hungary) and, in 1932, went to live in Switzerland, where he stayed until the end of World War II. He first studied in the Yeshiva at Baden and then at the University of Bern, where he obtained degrees in Political Science and Law (Rer.Pol. and Dr Jur.) After the war, Ehrman went to England and obtained the Rabbinical semicha (ordination) from Jews' College, London, in 1947. Moving to Israel, he became a member of the Israel Bar Association.

Ehrman served as Rabbi in the communities of Nairobi, Kenya and Bristol, England in the 1950s and in Streatham, London and in Watford in the 1970s. In between, he lived in Israel with his family, working first for the Ministry of Religious Affairs, then as a Research Fellow at the Institute for Research in Jewish Law, indexing the responsa of the Rosh; from 1965, he worked on his edition of the Talmud El Am. He also contributed numerous articles to the Encyclopaedia Judaica. Ehrman died in England in 1976.

== The Talmud El Am ==
In the 1960s the Talmud was seen as "a sealed book to the majority of the Jewish People", wrote Ehrman. He went on to say that the object of this new edition was "to open this sealed volume and to offer it to every Jewish home in a language and in a manner understandable to all; and also to enable one who is not a Jew to acquaint himself with the treasures of Judaism contained in it". At the time, making the Talmud available to English speakers in this way was trailblazing. It was decades before similar ventures were realised (for example by the Steinsaltz and Schottenstein editions).

The Talmud El Am prints the original text, punctuated, alongside Ehrman's translation. Below the text is his Commentary, which explains the text and the (mainly) Biblical references within it; Ehrman's text incorporates traditional Talmud Commentaries as well as contemporary scholarship. The Commentary is written as a continuous text, so that anyone unfamiliar with the Talmud may be able to learn. The margins carry articles on points of special interest raised by the text. These 'Realia' are written by contemporary authorities on subjects such as specific customs, philology, law, flora and fauna, often accompanied by illustrations. Notes on the Tannaim and Amoraim are also given here, as and when these Sages figure in the text.

The Talmud El Am edition contains Tractate Berakhot, chapters from Bava Metzia (Hammaphqid and Hazzahav), and the halachic section of the opening chapter of Kiddushin (29 Talmudic pages). Hazzahav adds the Jerusalem Talmud – edited by Rabbi Professor Daniel Sperber - at the end of the Babylonian text. The end of Berakhot is the work of Rabbi Dr Alexander Carlebach, who took over the editorship towards the end of Ehrman's life.

== Bibliography ==
- Uber das Wesen und die Wirkungen der Zollunion, insbesonders uber de Frage in wieweit die Staatssouveranitat durch die Zollunion beeintrachtigt wird. (Doctoral thesis). W.Friedli, Bern 1942
- Der Handschlag. Eine kleine Talmudisch-rechtliche Studie. W.Friedfli Bern 1945
- 'The Talmudic Concept of Sale', Journal of Jewish Studies, VIII/3-4, 1957
- 'Christian Interest in Rabbinics: John Selden (1584–1654)', Christian News From Israel,13/1. 1962
- 'Gentile Interest in Jewish Law: A Chapter from Selden's "De Successionibus", Christian News from Israel, 13/3-4, 1962
- 'Antichresis in the Talmud' (Hebrew with English summary), Sinai, 54/4-5, 1964
- 'The Order of Succession in Jewish Law – Selden against Origen' (Hebrew), Papers of the Fourth World Congress of Jewish Studies, vol.1, Jerusalem 1967
- 'Consideration in Jewish Law and English Law' (Hebrew), Papers of the Fifth World Congress of Jewish Studies, vol. III Jerusalem, 1972
- 'Praetium justum and laesio enormis in Roman and Jewish sources', The Jewish Law Annual, 3, 1980
- 'Fidei laesio in Jewish Law', paper delivered at the Sixth World Congress of Jewish Studies, Jerusalem 1973
- Editor of Talmud El Am (cf separate entry above), Jerusalem-Tel Aviv, 1965–1976
- Articles in Encyclopaedia Judaica: Antichresis, Asmakhta, Berakhoth, Conditions, Eduyoth, Kerithoth, Kinnim, Kethuboth, Horayoth, Kiddushin, Me'ila, Middoth, Menachoth, Megillah, Mo'ed Katan, Pesachim, Sanhedrin, Rosh Hashanah, Shekalim, Shabbath, Shevu'oth, Shevi'ith, Sotah, Temurah, Tamid.
