= Lazarus Goldschmidt =

Lazarus Goldschmidt (born at Plungė, December 17, 1871; died in England, April 18, 1950) was a German Jewish writer and translator. He translated the Babylonian Talmud into German, and was the first to translate the entire Babylonian Talmud.

He received his rabbinical education at the Talmudic school in Slobodki, near Kovno. In 1888 he went to Germany, and in 1890 entered the Berlin University, where, under the guidance of Professors Dillmann and Schrader, he devoted himself to the study of Oriental languages, especially Ethiopic.

By 1903, Goldschmidt, living at the time in Berlin, had published the following works:

- “Das Buch Henoch” retranslated from the Ethiopic into Hebrew, and edited with introduction, notes, and explanations (Berlin, 1892); "Bibliotheca Aethiopica," a list and description of all the known Ethiopic prints (Leipsic, 1893)
- “Das Buch der Schöpfung (ספר יצירה)” critical text, translation notes, etc. (Frankfort-on-the-Main, 1894);
- “Baraita de-Ma'ase Bereshit” the story of the Creation, ascribed to Arzelai bar Bargelai (Strasburg, 1894; this supposed Midrash is an Aramaic translation of the Ethiopic "Hexaemeron" of Pseudo-Epiphanias, edited by Trumpp in Ethiopic with a German translation, Munich, 1882, and the name of the supposed author is an anagram of Goldschmidt's Hebrew name, Eliezer ben Gabriel);
- “Vita do Abba Daniel” Ethiopic text, published, translated, and annotated in collaboration with F. M. E. Pereira (Lisbon, 1897); "Die Aethiopischen Handschriften der-Stadtbibliothek zu Frankfurt a. M." (Berlin, 1897).

== Talmud translation ==
In the year 1896 Goldschmidt commenced the publication of the Babylonian Talmud (from the editio princeps), with German translation, variants, and explanations. By 1903, the sections Zera'im and Mo'ed have been published, together with a part of the section Neziḳin. Both the edition of the text and the translation have been severely criticized by David Hoffmann in Brody's “Zeitschrift für Hebräische Bibliographie” i. 67–71, 100–103, 152–155, 181–185. Goldschmidt replied in a pamphlet, “Die Recension des Herrn Dr. D. Hoffmann über Meine Talmudausgabe im Lichte der Wahrheit” Charlottenburg, 1896. See also “Theologische Literaturzeitung” 1896, pp. 477–479, and 1897, pp. 631–633. The translation was also praised by other members of the neo-orthodox community, especially in the magazine Jeschurun “Durch Goldschmidts Übertragung werden vielen Thorabeflissenen technische Hindernisse aus dem Wege geschafft. Darum ist dieser Talmud in jeder Hinsicht eine große Tat! Goldschmidt's transmission removes technical obstacles for many Tora enthusiasts. That is why this Talmud is a great deed in every respect!” (Jeschurun, 17th year, issue 1–2 January 1930, page 96).

His translation of the Babylonian Talmud appeared from Leipzig 1897 to completion in London 1935. His “Subject concordance to the Babylonian Talmud” was published post mortem in Copenhagen in 1959.
