= Raphael Nathan Nota Rabinovicz =

Writer and rabbi (1835–1888)

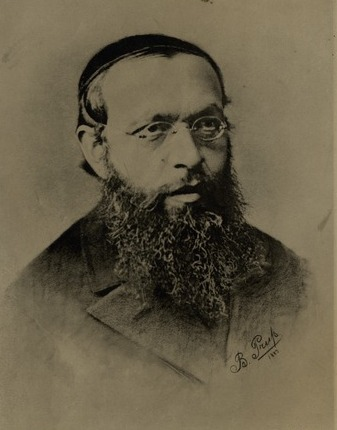

Raphael Nathan Nota Rabinovicz (Rabbinovicz/Rabbinowitz) (1835 – November 28, 1888) was a Lithuanian rabbi.

== Biography ==
He was born in 1835 in Novo-Zhagory, Kovno Governorate. At age 13, he moved to Wilkomir, where he studied Torah for two and a half years with the Gaon Rabbi Yossef ben Israel Isser. He then traveled to Keidan, where he married the daughter of Rabbi Aaron. He later studied in Kapulie, near Minsk. To escape conscription into the Russian army, he fled to Lemberg. In 1888, he died of pneumonia in Kiev.

He authored Dikdukei Soferim, a 15-volume work containing variant readings of half the six orders of the Mishna and two tractates of the Babylonian Talmud. Although he published/republished various other works, including a feature he titled Kunteres Dikdukei Soferim that appeared in a weekly Hebrew-language periodical, his magnum opus came out between 1867 and 1886. His research included visiting various European libraries. Noteworthy is its introduction's history of printings of the Talmud. A sixteenth volume was published posthumously (1897).

The timing of his work enabled him to use one font for the standard (Romm) Talmud and another for variants.

One translation of the title "Dikdukei Sofrim" and the idea behind it is "Fine Points of the Oral Law".
