= Munich Codex Hebraica 95 =

1342 copy of the Babylonian Talmud

The Munich Codex Hebraica 95 (Bavarian State Library, Cod. Heb. 95) was written by Solomon b. Samson (Shlomo ben Shimshon) in France. He completed his copying task in 1342. It is the only existing handwritten copy of the entire Babylonian Talmud "without Christian censorship".

Ease of tracing ownership has been facilitated since "numerous owners" wrote their name. It has been described as "containing 577 pages".

== Munich naming ==
The original owner cannot be determined, since a subsequent owner erased that owner's name, a practice that subsequent owners did not follow. Although it was written in France, it stopped moving from private owner to private owner when, together with other Jewish works, it was transferred to a government owned library in Munich, "and hence its name." The 95 reflects how it was cataloged.
