= World Congress of Jewish Studies =

World Congress of Jewish Studies is an annual conference on Jewish studies. The first congress occurred in 1947, before the founding of the State of Israel. The World Union of Jewish Studies (WUJS) was established in 1957, at the Second World Congress of Jewish Studies.

The Eighteenth World Congress of Jewish Studies was held at the Hebrew University of Jerusalem on August 8–12, 2022.

== Notable members ==
- William Chomsky, one of the world’s foremost Hebrew grammarians and father of Noam Chomsky
