= Social and cultural exchange in al-Andalus =

Coexistence of cultures in al-Andalus

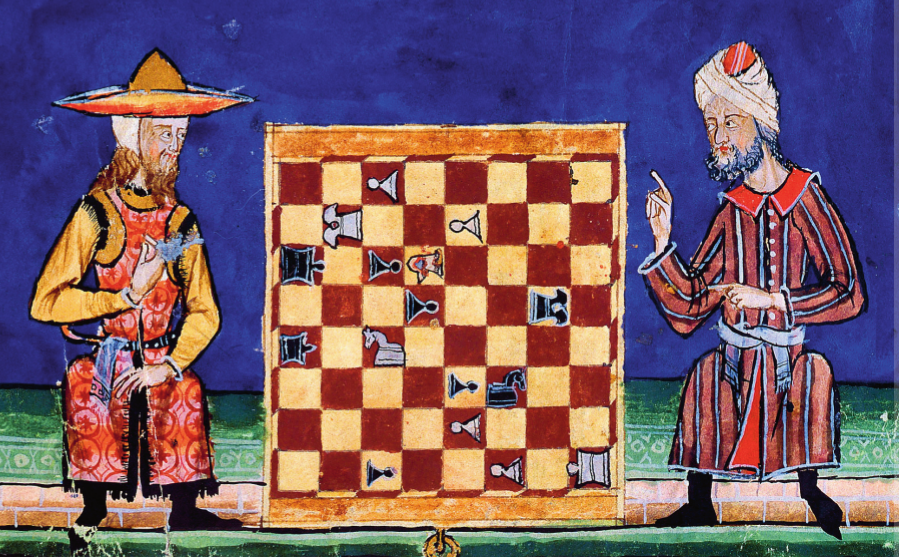
A Jew and a Muslim playing chess in 13th century al-Andalus.

Muslims, Christians, and Jews co-existed for over seven centuries in the Iberian Peninsula during the era of Al-Andalus states. The degree to which the Christians and the Jews were tolerated by their Muslim rulers is a subject widely contested among historians. The history of Al-Andalus indicates that Muslims, Christians, and Jews who lived within Al-Andalus had relatively peaceful relations, with the exception of a few scattered revolts, and times of religious persecution. The great amount of cultural and social interaction that took place between these three distinct social and religious groups led to the creation of a unique and diverse culture that continued to flourish even after the Reconquista.

== Social interaction ==
The Umayyad conquest of Hispania signalled the coming together of three different religions and the social customs and culture associated with each. This period has become known as the Convivencia, meaning culture of coexistence. Although this idea of a culture of tolerance is disputed by some historians, only a few instances of revolts and violence were actually recorded. This does not mean that discrimination by Muslims did not occur at the local level. However, the more educated classes of Muslims respected Christians and Jews under Islamic law as dhimmis (protected peoples) or People of the Book. The soldiers who carried out the conquest formed only a small minority of the population of the Iberian Peninsula. Thus the emergence of this unique Islamic society that formed in al-Andalus was a slow and uneven process. In order to understand how these distinct cultures and societies meshed into one, over time, it is important to recognize what was distinct about each and how they were viewed within the broader society.

Muslim clerics in Al Andalus viewed the non-Muslims as unclean and dirty and feared that too much contact with them would contaminate Muslims. in Seville the faqih Ibn Abdun issued these regulations segregating people of the two faiths:

A Muslim must not massage a Jew or a Christian nor throw away his refuse nor clean his latrines. The Jew and the Christian are better fitted for such trades, since they are the trades of those who are vile. A Muslim should not attend to the animal of a Jew or of a Christian, nor serve him as a muleteer [neither Catholics nor Jews could ride horses; only Muslims could], nor hold his stirrup. If any Muslim is known to do this, he should be denounced.… No … [unconverted] Jew or Christian must be allowed to dress in the costume of people of position, of a jurist, or of a worthy man [this provision echoes the Pact of Umar]. They must on the contrary be abhorred and shunned and should not be greeted with the formula, “Peace be with you,” for the devil has gained mastery over them and has made them forget the name of God. They are the devil’s party, “and indeed the devil’s party are the losers” (Qur’an 57:22). They must have a distinguishing sign by which they are recognized to their shame [emphasis added].

=== Muslims ===
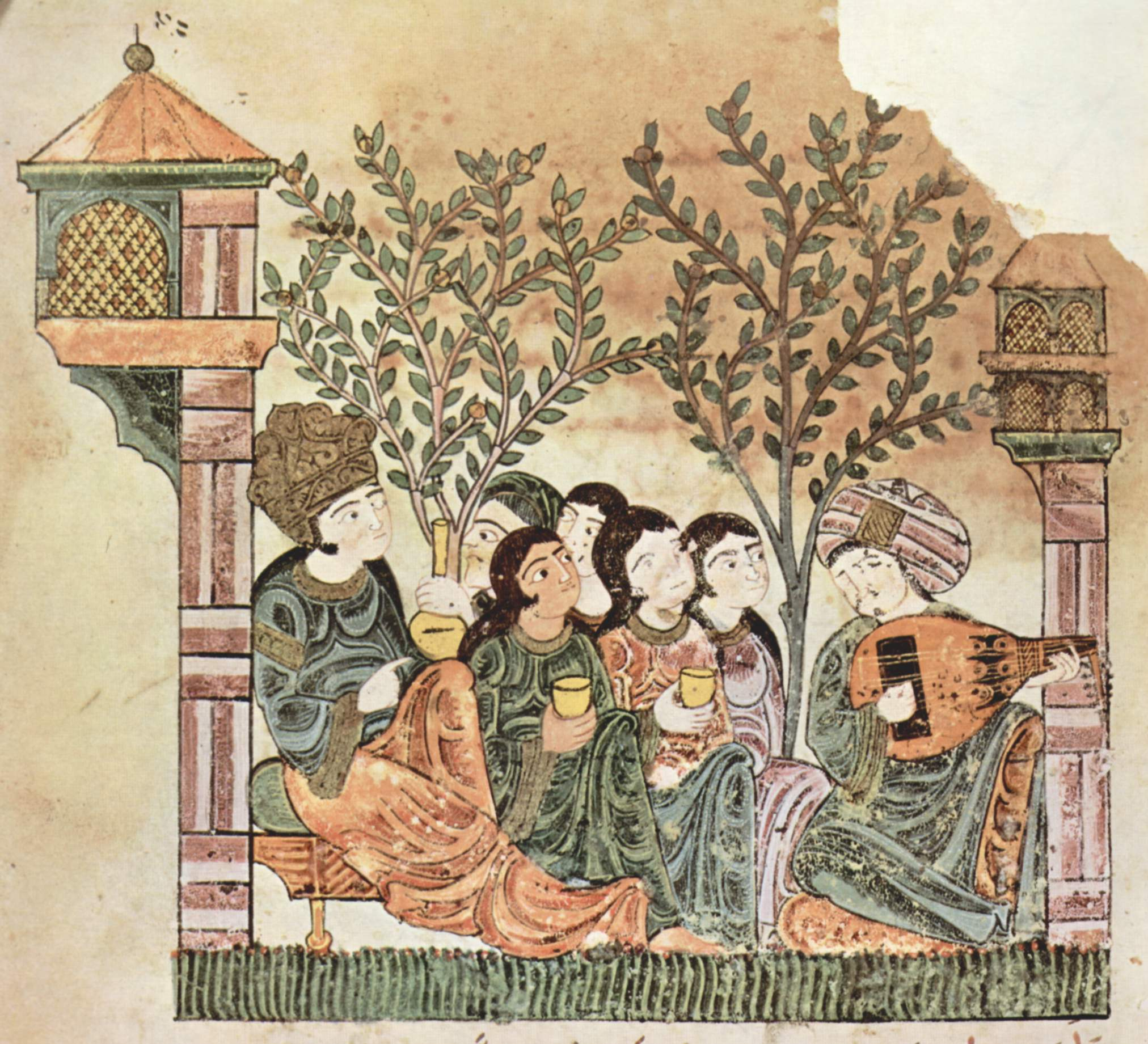
A self-depiction by the Muslims in Iberia. Taken from the Hadith Bayad wa Riyad.

In al-Andalus, Muslims were divided into three distinct ethnic groups. The Berbers, who mostly came from North Africa, were mostly sedentary in lifestyle, not to be confused with the nomadic Berbers found in roughly the same geographic region. In terms of social class, after the invasion, Berbers mostly went on to form the rural proletariat, although a number of them went to the cities, mostly working to pursue crafts. In terms of religion the Berbers were all Muslims, their ancestors having converted mostly to share in the wealth of Arab conquests.

The second group of Muslims found in al-Andalus was the Arabs. They formed a relatively small section of al-Andalus’ total population. They tended to have a higher economic position in society and constituted the majority of the ruling class. They owned land in the richest parts of the country. The most important cultural elements they brought with them were their language and the Arabic tradition of learning and high culture, which emulated that which could be found in Caliphate of Damascus.

However, the actual amount of culture these Arab invaders actually brought with them has been disputed by some historians. Historian W. Montgomery Watt argues that the ancestors of the Arabs that came to invade the Iberian Peninsula had been living a very rough life in the Middle East steppe, thus the actual invaders had little time to acquire a high level of culture. These Arab and Berber invaders were also busy consolidating their control, having little time and money to devote to purposefully spreading culture to the newly conquered regions. The Islamic Golden Age in Iberia was also, in part, a result of its geographic location and relative isolation from the central part of the Umayyad Empire. The Umayyad rulers felt the need to prove that they were the equals of those in West Asia. This was combined with their need to prove their worth as an independent region. It can thus be concluded that the invading Arabs brought some level of culture to the peninsula, but the high culture that was achieved during the golden age of al-Andalus was the result of the combination and growth of the multiple cultures present in the geographic area.

Muwalladun, or Muslims of Iberian descent, were far more numerous than those of purely Arabic descent. They were composed of those descended from the marriages of the original invading Arabs to the native women of Iberia along with those who converted to Islam by choice since the invasions. The muwalladun adopted Arabic genealogies and thus became further fused to the Arabs ethnically over time. By the 10th century, no clear distinction existed between muwalladun and Arab Muslims and by the tenth century, Muslims represented about 80% of the total population of al-Andalus, including Christian converts and the Berber Muslims.

=== Christians ===
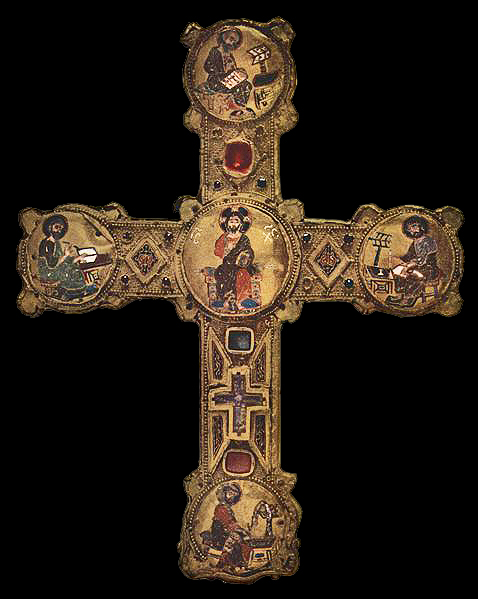

The Christians living in al-Andalus, both before and after the invasion, were the Visigoths, Hispano-Romans, and the native tribes of the Iberian Peninsula. The Visigoths and the Hispano-Romans formed the noble class prior to the Umayyads. The Christian population as a whole was predominantly Catholic, although some paganism and Arianism still persisted in some areas, mixing with the Catholic tradition.

Under the Christian Visigoth rule, a tradition of learning had been established at Seville by Isidore (636 AD). Over time, Seville became one of the leading intellectual centers of Christian Europe. This Isidorian tradition seems to have been abandoned in favor of the Arabic tradition, although it undoubtedly played a role in the further development of the Arabic tradition on the peninsula.

After the Muslim invasion, the Christians were classified under Islamic law as dhimmis. This status allowed them to practice their religion freely under the Umayyad dynasty. Christians were allowed to maintain many of their churches and the organization of the Church remained mostly intact, with the exception of the confiscation of many Catholic properties. Bishops and other high ranking church officials had to be approved by the Caliphate before they could take office.

Although culturally many Christians adopted the Arabic tradition, the cultural tradition of the Catholic Church and the culture that had developed under the Visigoths was maintained in monasteries by monks. The strong monastic tradition throughout the southern portion of the Iberian Peninsula continued to flourish and develop under Muslim rule. Within the cities, some Christians were able to rise to prominent positions within the Umayyad bureaucracy.

One example is of a Christian with the adopted name of [Abu Umar ibn Gundislavus], who became vizier under Abd al-Rahman III. Another example being, Revemund, a Christian who was a secretary under the same ruler and was later sent as an ambassador to Germany in 955–6. He eventually became the bishop of Elvira. Christian artisans, especially from the Eastern Roman Empire, were called to work on various building projects in the Caliphate of Córdoba. Some of these artisans remained integrated into Andalusian society. Although Christians lost the absolute dominant status they had previously experienced in Iberia, they were still able to gain positions of prominence under Muslim rule, however, these conditions deteriorated with the Almoravids and Almohads (see Restrictions Imposed on Christians and Jews).

=== Jews ===
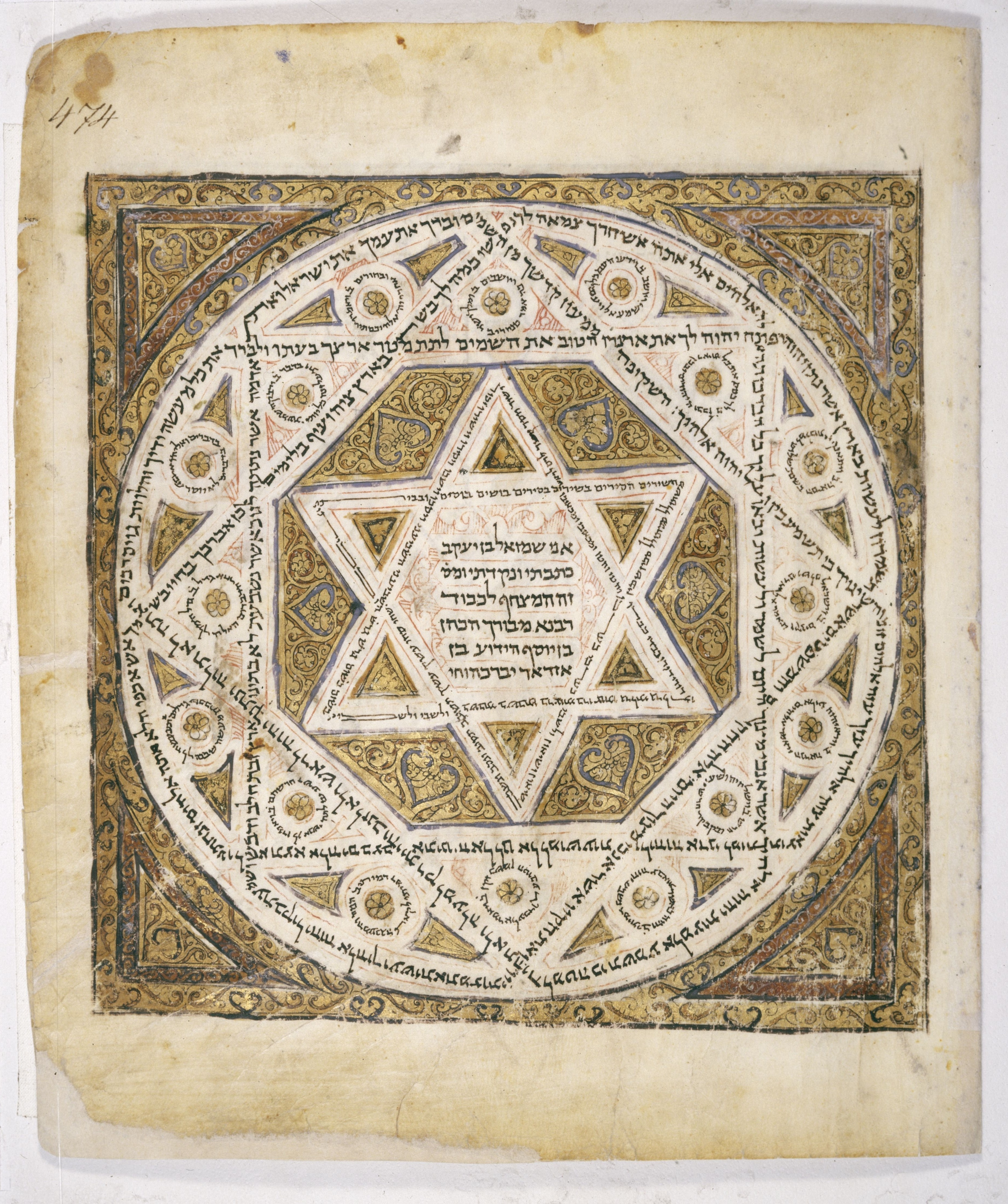
A page from the Leningrad Codex, the oldest complete manuscript of the Hebrew Bible using the Masoretic Text and Tiberian vocalization

Jews formed a small but significant ethnic minority in the Iberian Peninsula, constituting about 5% of the total population in al-Andalus. They began to settle in the Iberian Peninsula in significant numbers around the 1st century AD. Under Christian Visigothic rule, Jews faced persecution. In 613, the Visigothic King Sisebut issued a decree which forced Jews to convert to Christianity or be exiled and have their property confiscated. It comes as no surprise that many Jews welcomed their Muslim rulers and saw the Muslim conquest of the Iberian Peninsula as deliverance. After the conquest, under Islamic law, Jews were also categorized as dhimmis, having the same social standing as Christians. The Jewish communities scattered throughout the rural areas of al-Andalus remained fairly isolated, however Jews living in cities and towns, like those in Cordoba that became integrated into Islamic culture and society.

Jews came to hold very influential positions in the Umayyad bureaucracy. One example is the Jewish scholar and physician Hasdai ibn Shaprut, who served as a diplomat of the Umayyad government. Many Jews living in the cities also became involved in trade as merchants. Under the Caliphate of Cordoba, Jews experienced [A Golden Age of Jewish Culture] within Spain, in which Jewish scholars, philosophers, and poets prospered. Jews also contributed to the scientific and mathematic fields of study prominent in Cordoba at this time. Overall, Jews were granted better treatment, with the coming of the Muslims invaders, than they had previously experience under Christian rule. Conditions deteriorated under Almoravid and Almohad rule (see Restrictions Imposed on Christians and Jews).

== Restrictions imposed on Christians and Jews ==
Although Christians and Jews experienced a relatively high degree of religious and social freedom under Muslim rule, they did lack certain rights that were reserved exclusively for Muslims. The dihimmis, which included both Christians and Jews, were required to pay an annual poll tax called a jizya.

If a non-Muslim also owned a substantial amount of cultivatable land, they were required to pay the kharaj or land-tax. There were also certain restrictions and taxes levied on the church buildings themselves. Certain religious practices like processions, chanting, and church bell ringing, were also censored by law, although the enforcement of these laws varied from region to region. Under Islamic law, dihimmis were supposed to assume a subordinate position in that they were not allowed to hold authority over any Muslim. In practice, this was not the case, as many Christians and Jews acquired positions in the Cordoban bureaucracy as tax collectors, translators, and secretaries.

There, however, advantages to converting to Islam. The ability for social mobility changed drastically upon conversion to Islam. Converts had a greater ability to acquire wealth and status. Slaves were also instantly freed and enfranchised if they converted to Islam reciting the Shahada. Under the Almoravids tensions grew as more and more restrictions were forced upon non-Muslims, although a certain level of prosperity for religious minorities was still maintained under their rule. Under the Almohads these relative eras of tolerance ended with many Christians and Jews being forced to convert to Islam or face persecution. Many churches and synagogues were destroyed during Almohad rule and many Christians and Jews moved to the newly conquered Christian city of Toledo. Overall, relations between the various religious groups varied from region to region and the term convivencia, or culture of tolerance, cannot be universally applied to Al-Andalus.

Ibn Hazn (1064), a prominent poet and philosopher from Cordoba, described the Christian community as ‘altogether vile,’ demonstrating that prejudices against Christians persisted in Al-Andalus, although it is hard to gauge to what degree since they varied from region to region. The invasion of the Almoravids, and later the Almohads, signaled a shift and eventual end to the religious tolerance fostered under the Caliphate.

== Social mobility and conversion ==
In al-Andalus, Muslims referred to the converts to Islam as musalima or asalima and to the descendants of these converts as muwalladun (singular muwallad; Spanish: muladi)—a word derived from the language of cattle breeders and meaning “cross breed” or “mixed ones.” In other words, a descendant of a convert was seen as a “cross breed,” a “mixed one,” different from “pure” Arabic Muslims. The Islamic law scholar Felipe Maíllo Salgado has pointed out that in the Middle East the social inequality of the mawali (pl. of mawla: a non-Arab convert to Islam, often a former slave, who remains linked as a “client” to his Arab Muslim “protector” in a relationship of allegiance and “protection”) gave rise to a movement that brought about the fall of the Umayyad dynasty in Damascus and the rise of the Abbasid dynasty, which was supported by Persian mawali. The social inequality of the muladis, the descendants of the former Christians in al-Andalus, would cause analogous problems for the Umayyad dynasty in Córdoba.

Conversion to Islam translated into a higher rate of social mobility for Christians and Jews alike. There is little documentation available to indicate the conversion rates of Jews in Al-Andalus, although the numbers of Jewish converts have been estimated as relatively small. This is perhaps due to the tightly knit Jewish communities that had formed before the Muslim invasion.

Christians on the other hand were more eager to convert to Islam. Many wished to secure higher ranking government positions; while others took such liking to Islamic teaching and culture that they felt compelled to convert. Half of the Christians in Al-Andalus are reported to have converted to Islam by the 10th century, with more than 80% by the 11th century. Many Christians who did not accept Islam as their religion became increasingly Arabized in terms of culture. These Christians, known as Mozarabs or musta’ribs, a word meaning ‘Arabized’, adopted the Arabic language and customs.

Although the high conversion rates, as well as the adaptation of Arab culture homogenized the society of Al-Andalus to a degree, factionalism still persisted, which lead to occasional revolts and conflicts between the major religious groups.

== Religious and social conflicts ==
At the time of the invasion, many Christians did indeed resist Muslim rule. In these early years, certain kingdoms within Al-Andalus itself attempted to retain semi-autonomous status under Muslim rule, but were soon forced to submit. Many Christians also fled to the mountains up north and eventually formed the northern Christian kingdoms of Iberia that would eventually bring down Islamic rule in the Reconquista.

After this initial struggle, religious fervor did not manifest itself in the form of any significant religious revolts. This is shown by the fact that not a single religious revolt took place during the eighth century within al-Andalus. However, in the middle of the ninth century, a small group of zealous Christians led by Eulogius of Córdoba, a priest who was later canonized by the Catholic Church as a saint, caused a stir mostly around Córdoba by encouraging Muslims to convert to Christianity and publicly denouncing Islamic teaching. Both of these acts were punishable by death under Islamic law. These outbursts were mostly tied to the Christian monastic movement and purposeful martyrdom.

Between 851 and 859, Eulogius and forty-eight other Christians were put to death. The movement did not gain widespread support from Christians in al-Andalus and after the executions the movement subsided.

Professor Dario Fernandez Morera describes the decline of the native Christian culture of Iberia under the Muslim rule:

There was a large loss and decline of the native Hispano-Roman Christian culture under muslim rule. Almost none of the few remaining Christians in Merida could read a church inscription in latin by the 9th century (Muslim rulers took the inscription down and carried it to Córdoba as a sign of Islamic supremacy). Few Christians were left south of in southern Spain By 1085, When the king of Aragon annexed the Muslim kingdom of Valencia in 1238, he found no Christians there and When Ferdinand and Isabella conquered Granada in 1492, no Christian dhimmis were found in the city.

The Spanish historian Susana Calvo Capilla claims that whenever Muslim chronicles mention churches, it was usually to gloat over their destruction or their transformation into mosques as part of the humbling of the Christians.

An anti-Christian treatise published in Al-Andalus was titled as "Hammers [for breaking] crosses." The prominent Andalusian jurist Ibn Rushd decreed that golden “crosses must be broken up before being distributed” as plunder. “As for their sacred books [Bibles], one must make them disappear,” he added (he later clarified that unless all words can be erased from every page in order to resell the blank book, all Christian scripture must be burned). The systematic erasure of Spain's Christian heritage caused Peter II of Aragon to describe Muslims as those who “wished to abolish the memory of the Christian name.”

The Muslims states would launch constant raids into the northern Christian Kingdoms that were still holding out; due to these raids the “Christians of the North scarcely knew the meaning of repose, security, or any of the amenities of life.” An environment similar to and created by the eastern caliphates’ perennial war on the Byzantine Empire prevailed. A scorched no-man's-land along the Douro River, separated Muslim-ruled Spain from the northern Christian holdouts. After devastating the region the Muslims later named it "the Great Desert". Historian Louis Bertrand explains further:

To keep the Christians in their place it did not suffice to surround them with a zone of famine and destruction. It was necessary also to go and sow terror and massacre among them.... If one bears in mind that this brigandage was almost continual, and that this fury of destruction and extermination was regarded as a work of piety —it was a holy war against infidels—it is not surprising that whole regions of Spain should have been made irremediably sterile. This was one of the capital causes of the deforestation from which the Peninsula still suffers. With what satisfaction and in what pious accents do the Arab annalists tell us of those at least bi-annual raids. A typical phrase for praising the devotion of a Caliph is this: “he penetrated into Christian territory, where he wrought devastation, devoted himself to pillage, and took prisoners”.... At the same time as they were devastated, whole regions were depopulated.... The prolonged presence of the Musulmans, therefore, was a calamity for this unhappy country of Spain. By their system of continual raids they kept her for centuries in a condition of brigandage and devastation.

In the perspective of the Muslims, this frontier zone became a territory where one "fights for the faith and a permanent place of the Ribat.”

Military manuals compiled along the original Ribats of Anatolia were republished in Spain. the most famous of these manuels was "Kitab al-Jihad" written by Abd Allah ibn al-Mubarak. in Islamic Spain these manuels "enjoyed uninterrupted popularity, even more than in their homelands.... Above all, interest in historical narratives of sira and maghazi [the biography and jihad campaigns of Muhammad respectively] remained strong in al-Andalus.”

== Hybridisation of cultures ==
=== Art and architecture ===
One famous example that illustrates this desire of Muslim rulers’ to tie themselves to their ancestral homeland, while at the same inadvertently reflecting their multiculturalism, is the Great Mosque of Córdoba. Construction began under the reign of Abd ar-Rahman I in 784 AD and was completed in 987 AD. It was built in part to demonstrate the linkage between Al-Andalus and the ancestral land of the Arabs in Syria. The Great Mosque of Cordoba's architectural layout and style shares many similarities with the Great Mosque of Damascus (completed 715). They share many of the same features like the prayer halls, high ceilings held by double-tiered arcades on columns, and many mosaics.

Byzantium artisans are believed to have come to teach these techniques to Andalusian artisans. Some of the original Byzantium artisans also remained in Al-Andalus and became integrated into Andalusian society. Likewise, Christians and Jews adopted the Arabic architectural elements into their own churches and synagogues built under Moorish rule. This became known as the Mozarabic style. Mozarabic architecture included the absence of exterior decoration, diversity of floor plans, the use of the horseshoe arch in the Islamic style, and the use of the column as support, with a capital decorated with vegetable elements. Moorish styled architecture continued to be popular long after Muslim rule was pushed out of Spain by the Reconquista.

Many Christian Cathedrals were built in the Moorish architectural style. Jewish synagogues, like the Synagogue of El Tránsito in Toledo (built between 1357 and 1363), were built in the Moorish style. The Spanish-Moorish artistic style that is exemplified by the Synagogue of El Tránsito became known as the Mudejar style.

=== Language and literature ===
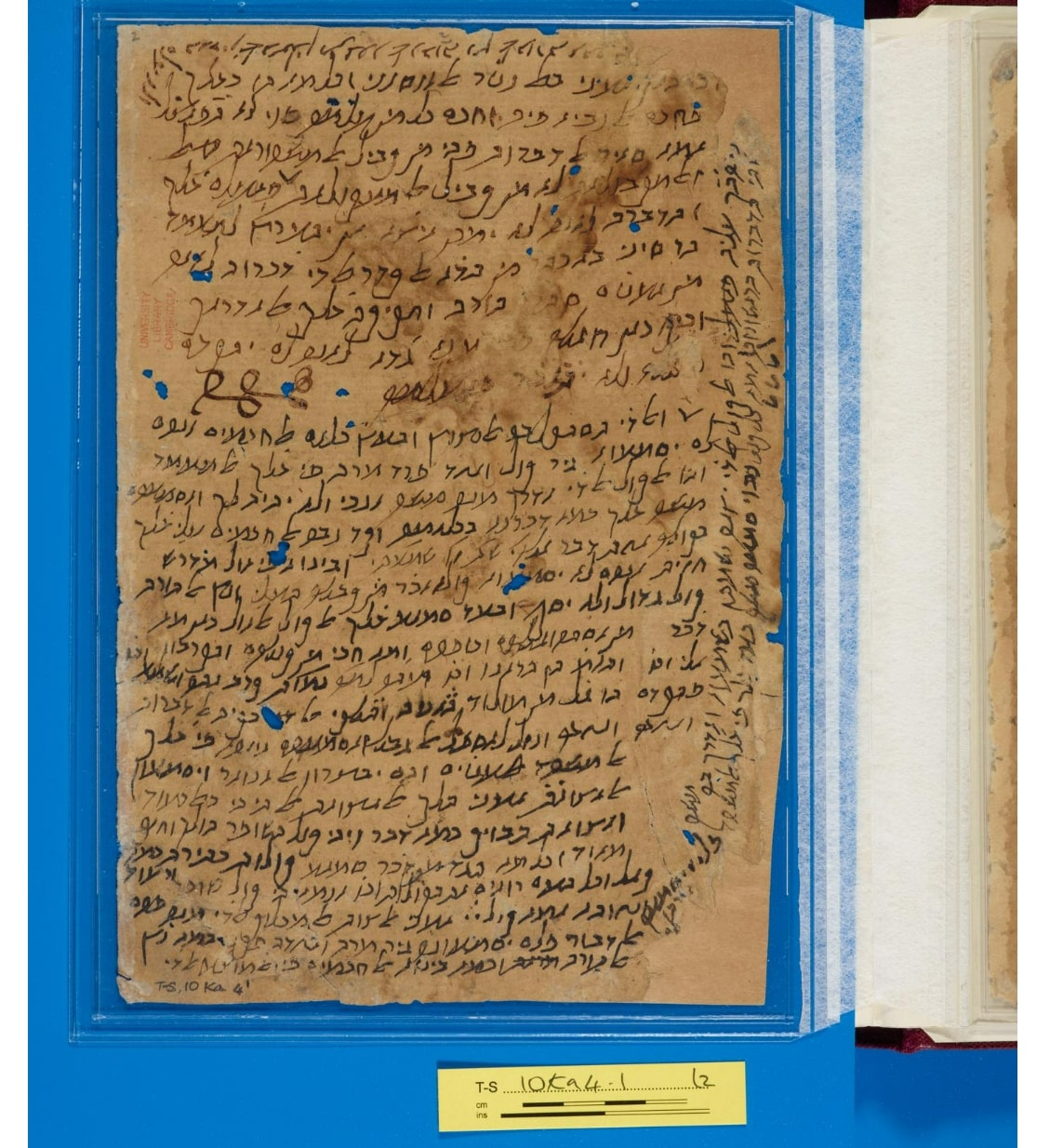
Manuscript page by Maimonides, one of the greatest Jewish scholars of Al Andalus, born in Córdoba. Arabic language in Hebrew letters

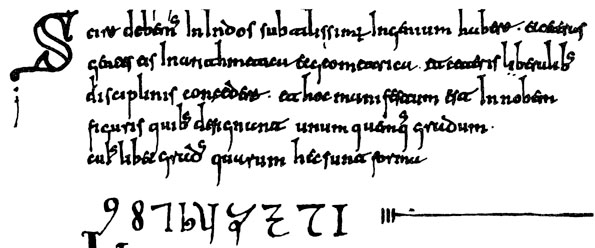
The first Arabic numerals in the West.

Much like art and architecture, language and literature are best understood as evolving together through a hybridisation process, in the context of Al-Andalus. It is also important to note that language and literature also had a huge impact on all ideas that flowed into all areas of study, which will be briefly touched on in this section.

The Arabic tradition in Al-Andalus has its roots in the Qur’an and in Arabic poems. These poems tended to have both religious and secular subject matter. Some of these poems contained secular themes and love stories that would later be influential to Iberian literature. By the 9th century these poems became lyrical and almost musical in nature. These types of musical poems became known as muwashshahs. The musical schools of Medina (الغناء المدني; al-Ghinā' al-Madanī) and of the Hejaz (الحجازي; al-Ḥijāzī) were popular in Al-Andalus, and this may have given rise to the naming by Moses ibn Ezra of four of his poems Ḥijāzīyyāt. Abd al-Rahman II had a section at his court known as Medinans, where he had singers from Medina, including the famous singers Fadal, Alam and Kalam. The Muslims also introduced translations of ancient Greek and Roman works that had been lost during the Dark Ages. The Muslim invaders declared Arabic the official language of Al-Andalus, but Arabic was only used by a small minority within the region.

Variations of Romance dialects persisted in many areas and the dialect varied from area to area with no clear boundaries. These Romance languages eventually fused with Arabic and some elements of Hebrew to form the Mozarabic dialect, which became influential in the literature produced in this geographic area. The later dispersion of Mozarabs across the Iberian peninsula explains why many of the words in modern-day Spanish, Portuguese, and Catalan are derived from these early Mozarabic Romance dialects. It must be stressed that no standard language existed on the Iberian Peninsula as a whole, or even in Al-Andalus itself, at the time this style took shape. This newly formed Mozarabic style first appeared in literature in the kharjas or choruses of the muwashshahs.

These kharjas were usually written in Arabic or Hebrew, but eventually appeared in a vernacular Mozarabic. style A literal mixture of phrases from the Iberian vernacular, Hebrew, and Arabic was not uncommon in the kharjas. Kharjas are of great importance to the Iberian literary and linguistic tradition because they represent a hybridisation of the Christian and Classical tradition of having repetitive choruses as those found in earlier lyric poems, with the Hebrew and Arabic tradition which emphasised love and the everyday struggles of life. This combination was important to linguistic development as vernacular Romance languages began to adopt and alter Arabic or Hebrew words found in the kharjas.

The evolution of the Mozarabic style in language and literature perpetuated what has come to be called the Golden age of Jewish culture in Spain. The dates for this so-called golden age are widely disputed although they correspond roughly with the beginning of the Caliphate of Cordoba, entering a decline under Almoravid rule, and being put to an end under Almohad rule. Jewish authors living in Al-Andalus became inspired by the influx of ideas that came with the wealth of literature. This literature represented both a translation of classical Greek and Roman works under rulers like al-Hakam II, which had been lost to Europeans previous to the Muslim invasion, and also the coming together of Christian and Arab ideas into entirely new works.

Muslim universities, libraries, courts, and to some degree Christian monasteries were hubs for literature, the former were also hubs for the hybridisation of literature and thus of ideas. Foreigners from across Europe and the Middle East came to these universities in Al-Andalus, contributing their own ideas, and translating many of the works in Al-Andalus upon their return home. As a result of this literary exchange, a wealth of new literature on the subject of theology, philosophy, science, and mathematics was produced during this time.

The works of Jewish philosopher and theologian Maimonides, Muslim polymath Ibn Rushd(Averroes), Muslim physician Abulcasis, Jewish scholar and physician Hasdai ibn Shaprut, are direct products of the cultural exchange manifested through literature. Their ideas are immortalised through literature, like the novelist Ibn Tufail whose work inspired John Locke’s theory of tabula rasa, which produced far-reaching waves. Both Jewish and Christian scholars adopted Arabic as their language of choice for academic purposes. Jewish poet Moses ben Jacob ibn Ezra, and Christian bishop Recemundus were both bilingual, the latter writing an Arabic-Christian liturgical calendar.

Literary development continued under the Almoravids, although a gradual decline occurred as a result of stricter enforcement of Islamic laws. Under the Almohads, the progressive development of literature, previously started under the Caliphate of Cordoba, almost ceased, with the Almohads censuring works they considered to undermine the authority of the Qur’an. Scholars, like Maimonides, were persecuted and forced to flee. The eventual expulsion of the Almohads, which resulted from the Christian Reconquista, saw a re-emergence of the literary works produced under the Caliphate of Cordoba. The Christian kingdoms of Iberia attempted to uphold the beacon of this literary tradition with the translation of many Arabic and Hebrew works into Latin and later the vernacular (see Toledo School of Translators).

== See also ==
- Timeline of the Muslim presence in the Iberian peninsula
- Muslim conquests
- Al-Garb Al-Andalus
- Almohad dynasty
- La Convivencia
- Islamic Golden Age
- Islam in Spain
- History of Islam
- History of the Jews under Muslim rule
- Golden age of Jewish culture in the Iberian Peninsula
- Islam and antisemitism#Spain
- Arab diaspora
- Spanish people
- Morisco
- Kemal Reis
- List of Moroccan writers#List of Moorish writers
