= Golden Age of Jewish culture in Spain =

Period in Jewish history

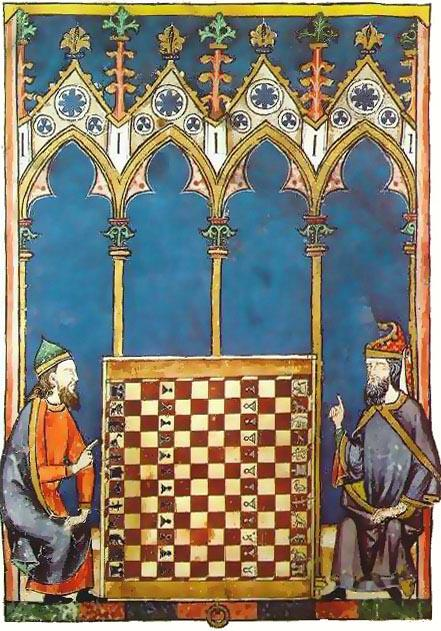
Illustration from the Libro de los juegos (lit. 'Book of Games') depicting two Jews playing Grant Acedrex, 13th century

The Jewish Golden Age in Spain began shortly after the Muslim conquest in the 8th century. Its end date is debated, with some saying that it ended with the persecution of Jews by the Almohad Caliphate in the 1100s, and others saying it lasted until the Christian Reconquista resulted in the expulsion of Jews by the 15th century. During this period, Jews living in what was collectively called al-Andalus (Iberian territories under Muslim rule 711–1492, now Spain, Portugal, and Gibraltar) experienced relative tolerance, prosperity, and socio-cultural integration within the broader Muslim society that had come to dominate the region, though Spanish scholar Américo Castro considered the country's hegemonic religion to have switched from Islam to Christianity starting in 1252 with the reign of Alfonso X of Castile. Owing to this environment, Jewish culture flourished and several Jews rose to prominence in scholarly and religious spheres, including Maimonides, Hasdai ben Shaprut, Shmuel ha-Nagid, Solomon ben Judah, and Judah ha-Levi. The Jewish community of al-Andalus also contributed greatly to and benefited from the Muslim world's advancements in astronomy, medicine, and science.

Jews under Muslim authority in Spain and Portugal were designated as dhimmi (Arabic: ذمي)—a legally protected class of non-Muslim subjects—in exchange for paying jizya (جِزْيَة) and accepting certain restrictions. Although they still held a second-class status relative to Muslims, the dhimmi framework in al-Andalus gradually allowed for the development of stability and co-existence that was otherwise uncommon in Jewish history in Europe; Jews were able to occupy a variety of positions in government and diplomacy, medicine, and science, while also playing a key role in the Muslim world's transmission of classical knowledge to Christian Europe. Further, the Jewish Golden Age in Spain brought about remarkable achievements in Hebrew poetry, religious scholarship, grammar, and philosophy. Some historians, however, view this to be more of a myth.

The exact nature and length of this particular "Golden Age" for Jews has been debated, as there were at least three periods during which non-Muslims were widely oppressed in al-Andalus. A few scholars give the start date of the Jewish Golden Age in Spain as falling in the years when the region was conquered and annexed by the Umayyad Caliphate. Others date it from 912, during the reign of Abd al-Rahman III, who founded the Caliphate of Córdoba. The end of the Jewish Golden Age is variously dated to periods of heightened instability and persecution under the Almoravids and Almohads or ultimately to the issuing of the Alhambra Decree by the Catholic Monarchs of Spain in 1492.

== Historiography ==
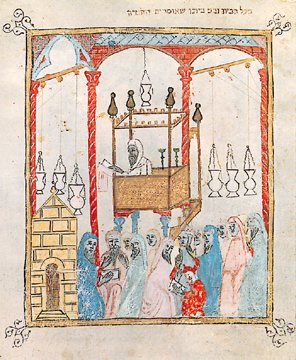
Image of a cantor reading the Passover story in Al-Andalus, from the 14th century Haggadah of Barcelona.

Having invaded southern Spain and coming to rule in a matter of seven years, Islamic rulers were confronted with many questions relating to the implementation of Islamic rule of a non-Islamic society. The coexistence of Muslims, Jews, and Christians Convivencia during this time is revered by many writers. Al-Andalus was a key center of Jewish life during the early Middle Ages.

María Rosa Menocal, a specialist in Iberian literature at Yale University, argues that "tolerance was an inherent aspect of Andalusian society". Jews were granted religious freedom but experienced prohibitions on proselytisation, displays of religious symbols, and on synagogue construction. Menocal argues that this created the conditions for tolerance and an improvement of Jewish civic and political status.

Bernard Lewis writes that Islam traditionally did not offer equality to Jews but allowed them to practice their religion and live according to their own laws. The restrictions Muslims imposed on Jews, Lewis writes, were symbolic rather than tangible, and were not aimed at oppressing Jews. Lewis recognizes Moorish Spain as holding some degree of religious toleration, though stops short of using the term "Golden Age", stating:

If we look at the considerable literature available about the position of Jews in the Islamic world, we find two well-established myths. One is the story of a golden age of equality, of mutual respect and cooperation, especially but not exclusively in Moorish Spain; the other is of "dhimmi"-tude, of subservience and persecution and ill treatment. Both are myths. Like many myths, both contain significant elements of truth, and the historic truth is in its usual place, somewhere in the middle between the extremes.

Further, he suggests that as early as the 11th century Islamic societies were decaying, primarily the byproduct of internal problems like "cultural arrogance," which was a barrier to creative borrowing, rather than external pressures like the Crusades.

Mark R. Cohen, Professor of Near Eastern Studies at Princeton University, in his Under Crescent and Cross, calls the idealized interfaith utopia a "myth" that was first promulgated by Jewish historians such as Heinrich Graetz in the 19th century as a rebuke to Christian countries for their treatment of Jews. This myth was met with the "counter-myth" of the "neo-lachrymose conception of Jewish-Arab history" by Bat Ye'or and others, which also "cannot be maintained in the light of historical reality". Cohen adds that the "Golden Age" myth has been used since the nineteenth century by Muslims who use it "as a weapon against Zionism and the State of Israel," in which the claims "soft-pedal the legal inferiority of the Jews and gloss over, or ignore, episodes of violence that call the harmony into question."

== Beginnings of the Golden Age ==
=== Muslim conquest of Christian Spain ===
Prior to 589, the Jewish population of Spain was tolerated by its Arian Visigoth rulers and placed on equal footing with the other ethnic and religious communities of the region. The Arians may have preferred the Jewish population to the Catholic one, as they did not fear political enmity from the Jews. The Visigoths were mainly indifferent towards Jews and allowed them to grow and prosper. After the Visigoths joined the Catholic Church, they placed ever greater economic burdens on the Jewish population, and later persecuted them severely. It is possible that Jews welcomed the Muslim Arab and mainly-Berber conquerors in the 8th century.

=== Status of Jews under Islamic law ===
A period of tolerance dawned for the Jews of the Iberian Peninsula. Their number was considerably augmented by immigration from North Africa in the wake of the Muslim conquest. Immigrants from North Africa and the Middle East bolstered the Jewish population and made Muslim Spain probably the largest centre of contemporary Jews. Nevertheless, their numbers were comparably low to the other ethnic groups on the Iberian peninsula and Eliyahu Asthor estimates their number at a little over 0.5% of the total Iberian population, but with a presence of up to 15-20% in some towns and cities. Especially after 912, during the reign of Abd al-Rahman III and his son, Al-Hakam II, the Jews prospered culturally, and some notable figures held high posts in the Caliphate of Córdoba. Jewish philosophers, mathematicians, astronomers, poets and rabbinical scholars composed highly-rich cultural and scientific work. Many devoted themselves to the study of the sciences and philosophy, composing many of the most valuable texts of Jewish philosophy. Jews took part in the overall prosperity of Muslim Al-Andalus. Jewish economic expansion was unparallelled. In Toledo, after the Christian reconquest in 1085, Jews were involved in translating Arabic texts to the romance languages in the so-called Toledo School of Translators, as they had been previously in translating Greek and Hebrew texts to Arabic. Jews also contributed to botany, geography, medicine, mathematics, poetry and philosophy.

'Abd al-Rahman's court physician and minister was Hasdai ibn Shaprut, the patron of Menahem ben Saruq, Dunash ben Labrat and other Jewish scholars and poets. In following centuries, Jewish thought flourished under famous figures such as Samuel Ha-Nagid, Moses ibn Ezra, Solomon ibn Gabirol and Judah Halevi. During 'Abd al-Rahman's term of power, the scholar Moses ben Hanoch was appointed rabbi of Córdoba, and as a consequence al-Andalus became the center of Talmudic study, and Córdoba the meeting-place of Jewish savants.

It was a time of partial Jewish autonomy. As "dhimmis", "protected non-Muslims", Jews in the Islamic world paid the jizya, which was administered separately from the zakat paid by Muslims. The jizya has been viewed variously as a head tax, as payment for non-conscription in the military (as non-Muslims were normally prohibited from bearing arms or receiving martial training) or as a tribute. Jews had their own legal system and social services. Monotheist religions of the People of the Book were tolerated but conspicuous displays of faith, such as bells and processions, were discouraged.

Comparing the treatment of Jews in the medieval Islamic world and medieval Christian Europe, the Jews were far more integrated in the political and economic life of Islamic society, and usually faced far less violence from Muslims, but there were some instances of persecution in the Islamic world as well from the 11th century. The Islamic world classified Jews and Christians as dhimmis and allowed Jews to practice their religion more freely than they could in Christian Europe.

Other authors criticize the modern notion of Al-Andalus being a tolerant society of equal opportunities for all religious groups as a "myth". Jews were living in an uneasy coexistence with Muslims and Catholics, and the relationship between the groups was more often than not marked by segregation and mutual hostility. In the 1066 Granada massacre of much of the Jewish population of the city, the Jewish death toll was higher than in the much-publicized Christian pogroms in the Rhineland slightly later.

== End of the Golden Age ==
=== Crises in al-Andalus ===
With the death of Al-Hakam II in 976, the caliphate began to dissolve, and the position of the Jews became more precarious under the various smaller kingdoms. The first major persecution was the 1066 Granada massacre, which occurred on 30 December in which a Muslim mob stormed the royal palace in Granada, crucified the Jewish vizier Joseph ibn Naghrela and massacred many of the Jewish population of the city. According to one source, "more than 1,500 Jewish families, numbering 4,000 persons, fell in one day". It was the first persecution of Jews on the Peninsula under Islamic rule.

==== Anti-Jewish riots and intra-Muslim wars ====
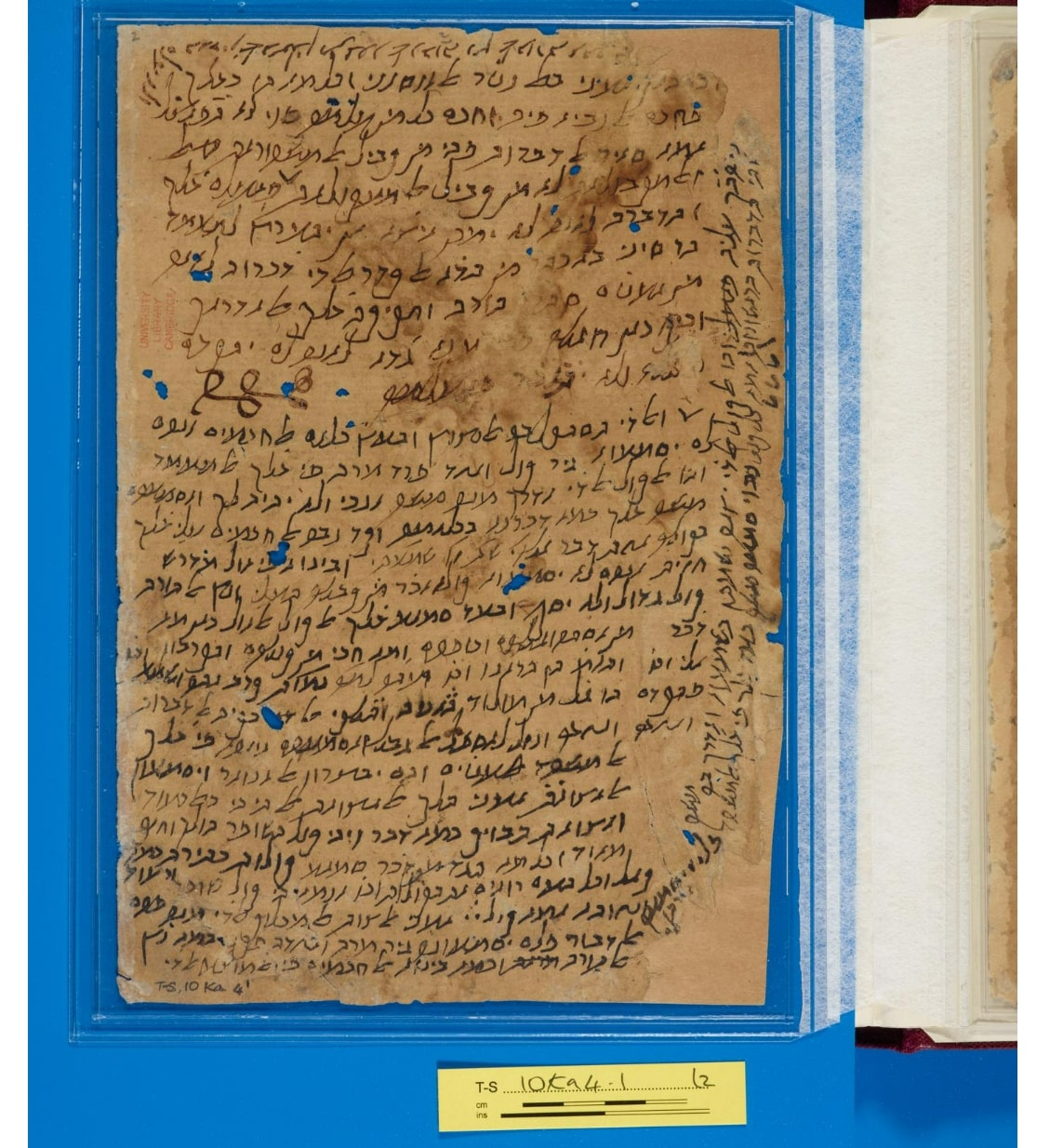
Manuscript page by Maimonides, one of the greatest Jewish scholars of Al Andalus, born in Córdoba, in Arabic in the Hebrew script.

Beginning in 1090, the situation deteriorated and Muslim religious attitudes hardened further with the invasion of the Almoravids, a puritan Muslim dynasty from Morocco. The Jewish community of Granada, barely re-established following the massacre, was destroyed during the sack of Granada by the Almoravids that same year. Jews were slowly pushed out from civil and political positions, though there were some exceptions and some Jews even held the title of "vizier" ("nasi") such as the poet and physician Abu Ayyub Solomon ibn al-Mu'allam, Abraham ibn Meïr ibn Kamnial, Abu Isaac ibn Muhajar and Solomon ibn Farusal. Nevertheless, Andalusian religious scholarship was still ongoing and the art of Hebrew poetry reached a highpoint with the verses of Judah ha-Levi. However, from that time onwards, Jews were sometimes safer in northern Spain under Christian rulers.

In 1146, the fundamentalist Berber Almohad dynasty began its conquest of al-Andalus, in 1147 defeating the Almoravids and bringing almost all of Islamic Spain under its control by 1172 with the defeat of the taifas. The Almohads tolerated neither Christians nor Jews and, having already extinguished the indigenous Christian communities that had existed in North Africa for a millennium, they also put before the Jews the choice between conversion and death. Many Jews, and even Muslim scholars, fled the Muslim-controlled portion of Iberia either to more tolerant Muslim countries such as Ayyubid Egypt and Syria or fled over the frontier into Christian Spain. The notable Jewish philosopher Moses Maimonides (1138–1204) was forced to flee from Al-Andalus to avoid conversion by the Almohads. In Letter to Yemen, Maimonides wrote:

Dear brothers, because of our many sins Hashem has cast us among this nation, the Arabs, who are treating us badly. They pass laws designed to cause us distress and make us despised.... Never has there been a nation that hated, humiliated and loathed us as much as this one.

There were also mass conversions of Jews to Islam, but similar to under the Visigothic rulers, they often practised their religion secretly and were mistrusted by Muslims. Questioning their sincerity, the Caliph Yaqub al-Mansur still treated the new converts to Islam as if they were dhimmis, not only limiting their civil rights but also having them wear distinguishing clothing consisting of blue-black garments, ludicrous caps and the shikla. Yaqub's son changed the colours later to yellow garments and turbans, a colour that the Muslim in general frowned on since the times of Muhammad himself.

=== Fall of al-Andalus and Jewish exodus ===
Thus, the Almohad persecutions ended the flourishing Jewish settlements in Muslim Spain at the end of the twelfth century. Starting from the period of the 11th and 12th centuries, Christian Kingdoms in the north began pushing south, gradually reclaiming land in the Reconquista. By the 1200s, Muslim rule was reduced to just the Emirate of Granada, in the south governed by the Nasrid dynasty, which lasted until 1492. According to Spanish scholar Américo Castro, "between the ferocious laws of the Fuero Juzgo against the Jews […] and the very sweet ones of Alfonso the Wise, lie five hundred years of Islam." (Note: Excerpt Spanish original: «[E]ntre las leyes feroces del Fuero Juzgo contra los judíos […] y las muy dulces de Alfonso el Sabio median quinientos años de Islam».) The Jewish presence in Iberia continued in the Christian territories until the Jews were forced to leave or to convert to Christianity in the Alhambra Decree of 1492 and a similar decree by Portugal in 1496.

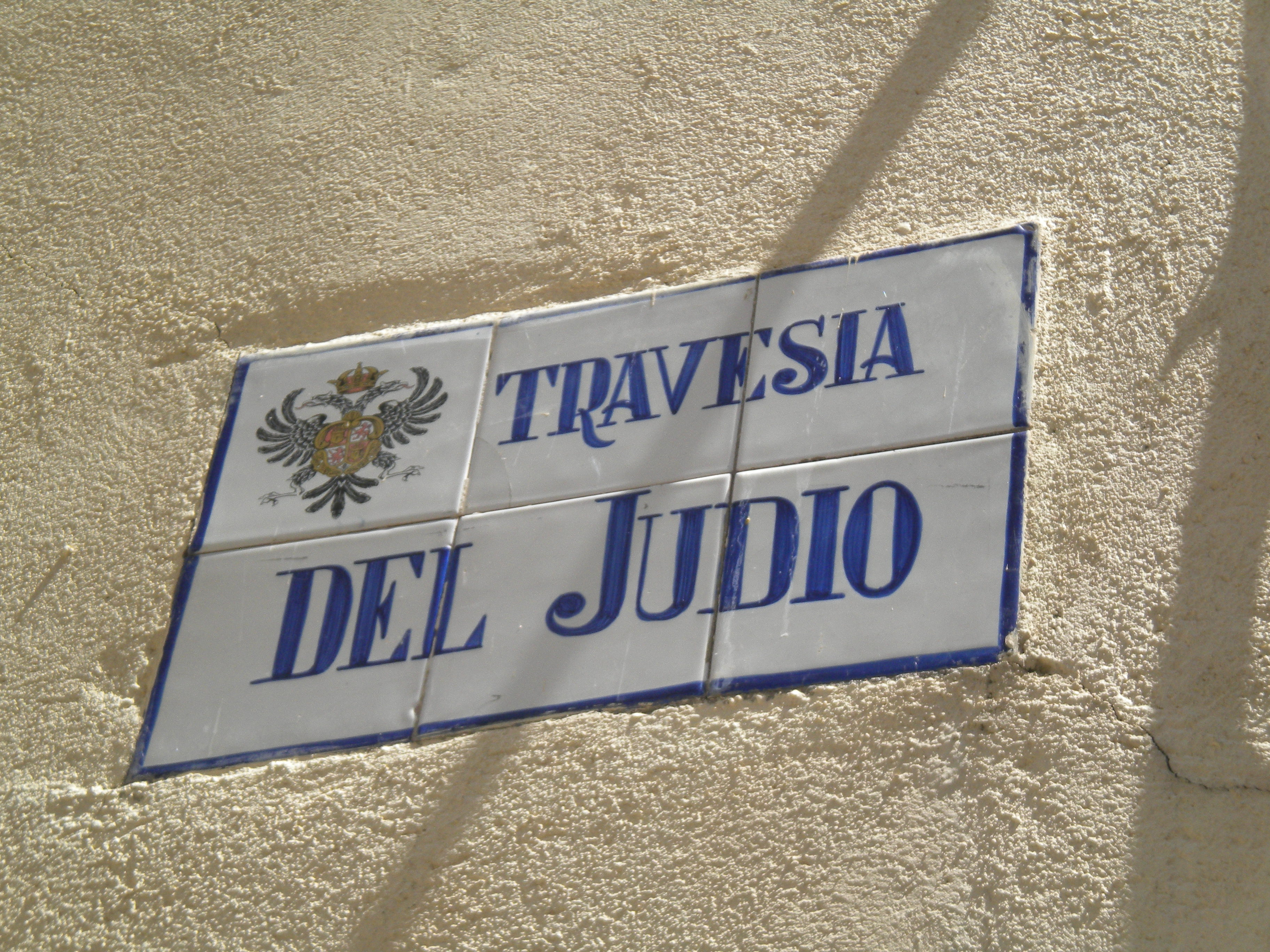
Jewish Street (Toledo, Spain)

== Notable Jewish figures ==
- Abu al-Fadl ibn Hasdai, philosopher, vizier at Taifa of Zaragoza
- Joseph ibn Hasdai, poet, father of Abu al-Fadl ibn Hasdai
- Yekutiel ben Isaac ibn Hassan, poet, talmudist and vizier at Taifa of Zaragoza, fell from favor, executed.
- Abu Ruiz ibn Dahri fought in the war against the Almohades.
- Ibrahim ibn Yaqub, traveller, probably a merchant.
- Amram ben Isaac ibn Shalbib, scholar and diplomat in the service of Alfonso VI of Castile
- Bahya ibn Paquda, philosopher and author of Chovot HaLevavot
- Bishop Bodo-Eleazar; according to the Jewish Encyclopedia, "a convert to Judaism ... [who]... went to Córdoba, where he is said to have endeavored to win proselytes for Judaism from among the Spanish Christians."
- Dunash ben Labrat (920–990), poet
- Isaac Albalia, astronomer and rabbi at Granada
- Jehiel ben Asher, poet
- Joseph ibn Migash, diplomat for Granada
- Maimonides, also known by the acronym 'Rambam', author of Mishnah Torah, Guide to the Perplexed, and commentator on the Mishnah, rabbi, scholar, physician, and philosopher
- Menahem ben Saruq, philologist
- Nachmanides, also referred to by the acronym Ramban, scholar, rabbi, philosopher, physician, kabbalist, and biblical commentator.
- Solomon ibn Gabirol, poet and philosopher
- Moses ben Enoch, rabbi and Talmudic scholar
- Yehuda Halevi, poet and philosopher
- Samuel ha-Levi, treasurer of king Pedro I "the Cruel" of Castile
- Abraham ibn Ezra, rabbi and poet
- Moses ibn Ezra, philosopher and poet
- Benjamin of Tudela, traveler and explorer
- Samuel ibn Naghrillah, king's minister at Taifa of Granada and poet
- Joseph ibn Naghrillah, king's minister, son of Samuel ibn Naghrillah
- Hasdai ibn Shaprut, royal physician and statesman
- Judah ben Saul ibn Tibbon, translator and physician
- Joseph ibn Tzaddik, rabbi, poet and philosopher.
- Abraham ibn Daud, astronomer, historian, and philosopher. He is sometimes known by the abbreviation Rabad I or Ravad I.

== See also ==
- Al-Andalus
- History of the Jews in Poland - Between c. 1025 – c. 1700 AD, called Paradisus Judaeorum (Latin for "Paradise of the Jews")
- History of the Jews in Portugal
- History of the Jews in Spain
- History of Portugal
- History of Spain
- Judeo-Islamic philosophies (800–1400)
- La Convivencia
- Reconquista
- Sephardim under Islam
- Spanish Inquisition and repression of the Jews
- Timeline of Portuguese history
- Timeline of the Muslim presence in the Iberian Peninsula

== Bibliography ==
- Esperanza Alfonso, Islamic culture through Jewish eyes : al-Andalus from the tenth to twelfth century, 2007 ISBN 978-0-415-43732-5
- Johnson, Paul (1994) [1987]. A History of the Jews. London: Orion Books Limited, Orion House. ISBN 1-85799-096-X.
- Joel Kraemer, "Comparing Crescent and Cross," The Journal of Religion, Vol. 77, No. 3. (Jul., 1997), pp. 449–454. (Book review)
- "The Myth of the Andalusian Paradise" by Darío Fernández-Morera – critique of view of Al-Andalus as tolerant society
- Stillman, Norman A. (1979). The Jews of Arab lands : a history and source book. Philadelphia : Jewish Publication Society of America. ISBN 978-0-8276-0116-1.
