= Tobiah ben Eliezer =

Talmudist and poet of the 11th century

Tobiah ben Eliezer (Hebrew: טוביה בן אליעזר) was a Talmudist and poet of the 11th century, author of Lekach Tov or Pesikta Zutarta, a midrashic commentary on the Pentateuch and the Five Megillot.

== Biography ==
Zunz inferred from Tobiah's reference to his father as "the great" and from his mention of the massacre in Mainz in 1096, that he was a native of Mainz and a son of Eliezer ben Isaac ha-Gadol, who is thought by David Conforte to have been one of Rashi's teachers. But as in the course of his work Tobiah often attacks the Karaites and, besides, manifests a thorough knowledge of Muslim customs, Samuel Judah Löb Rapoport concluded that toward the end of his life Tobiah settled in the Land of Israel, the modern-day country of Israel.

As to Tobiah's birthplace, it has been proved by Solomon Buber that he was a native of Kastoria at that time in Bulgaria, as is testified to by Tobiah's countryman Judah Leon Mosconi in his supercommentary on Ibn Ezra's commentary on the Pentateuch. According to him, the author of the commentary on the Pentateuch mentioned by Ibn Ezra in the preface to his own work was a certain Meïr of Castoria, a pupil of Tobiah b. Eliezer. On the other hand, in his commentary on Ecclesiastes, Tobiah mentions a R. Samson as his teacher; and Buber supposes that he may be identical with the Samson quoted by Rashi in his commentary on Isaiah 58:14 and Amos 6:3. It is also to be concluded from various dates given in Lekach Tov that he wrote it in 1097 and revised it in 1107 or 1108.

== Lekach Tov ==
=== Name ===
Tobiah himself entitled his work "Lekach Tov" in allusion to his name Tobiah; and it is so cited by the earlier rabbis. Since the mid-16th century, however, it has been most often referred to as Pesikta Zutarta (= "the Lesser Pesikta") in distinction to the Pesikta Rabbati (= "the Greater Pesikta"). This second title was because the editors of the part relating to Leviticus, Numbers, and Deuteronomy (Venice, 1546), found no title in the manuscript, but noted that every verse was headed פס "piska", and took it for granted that it was entitled Pesikta. Consequently, the rimed title which, Zunz (l.c.) thinks, was composed by the press-corrector Johanan Treves begins פסיקתא זוטרתא או רבתא ("Pesikta, be it small or great"). In the colophon the editors call it "Pesikta Zutarta." It was owing to the latter title that Lekach Tov was confused with the Pesikta Rabbati by Gedaliah ibn Yaḥya, J. Heilprin, Azariah dei Rossi, and others.

=== Characteristics ===
In the commentary, every weekly parsha is introduced by a Biblical verse containing the word "ṭob." Moreover, in the text he very often says, "I, Tobiah b. Eliezer" or "Tobiah said." It is true that in the Jerusalem manuscript there occurs very often the expression "our teacher Tobiah b. Eliezer," from which it might be assumed that Lekach Tov was written by Tobiah's pupils; but from a closer examination of the text, and to judge from the Florence manuscript, it is evident that the expression in question is merely a copyist's mistake.

Lekach Tov covers the whole Pentateuch and the Five Megillot. It is in reality half a simple ("peshaṭ") commentary, giving the grammatical meaning of the words, and half aggadah. But in many instances Tobiah declares that the standard interpretation is the simple one. Even in his aggadic interpretation, which he derives from the Talmud and from the pre-Talmudic and post-Talmudic literatures, Tobiah manifests his love of good style. He endeavors to arrange the various midrashim in perfect order and to edit them in few words and clear language. He therefore shortens the midrashic passages, and, instead of the Aramaic in which those passages were written, renders them into good Hebrew, omitting also the foreign words which occur in the midrashim. In the parts of the Pentateuch which deal with the commandments he inserts many halakhot, apparently taken from various halakhic collections, particularly from Achai Gaon's She'eltot. The Talmudic passages which he cites in connection with the halakhot he often interprets according to his own judgment and differently from Rashi.

Throughout the whole commentary Tobiah shows his thorough knowledge of Hebrew grammar and his acquaintance with the works of the earlier grammarians. Incidentally it may be remarked that he seems to have held the opinion that the Hebrew roots are not necessarily triliteral. In certain places he interprets a Biblical word as though it were a mishnaic or Talmudic one. He considers there is not a letter too many or too few in the whole Pentateuch; and he bases many of his aggadic interpretations on the Qere and Ketiv.

One of the main features of his commentary is the allegorical interpretation of all the Biblical passages which speak of God as a corporeal being. He likewise considers that the expressions in R. Ishmael's Heikhalot must be taken figuratively. In many places he refutes assertions of the Karaites, though he does not expressly name their authors. Like many other Biblical commentators, he translates certain words into the language of the country in which he is living, namely, Greek.

=== Sources ===
Tobiah seldom mentions the sources for his commentary; but they are found to be as follows: Targum of Onqelos; Baraita of R. Ishmael; Baraita of R. Eliezer ben Jose ha-Gelili; Sifra; Sifre; Mekhilta; Seder Olam; Sefer Yeẓirah; the Jerusalem and Babylonian Talmud; Genesis Rabbah; a midrash on the blessing of Jacob; Leviticus Rabbah; midrash on the Five Megillot; Tanchuma; Yelammedenu; Pirkei de-Rabbi Eliezer; Baraita di-Meleket ha-Mishkan; Aggadat Mashiaḥ; Heikhalot of R. Ishmael; Sefer ha-Yashar; Midrash Abkir; Midrash Hashkem; and many other midrashim.

It seems that he utilized the She'eltot of R. Achai, the Halakot Gedolot, and the Yosippon. He quotes also Eleazar ha-Ḳalir, Saadia, Hai Gaon, Shabbethai Donnolo, Ben Asher, Ben Naphtali, and his teacher R. Samson, while he cites passages from Menahem ben Saruk and Moses ha-Darshan without mentioning their names.

=== Influence ===
Tobiah is in turn quoted by those of Rashi's pupils who redacted the Liḳḳuṭe ha-Pardes, and by the following: Menahem ben Solomon in his "Sekhel Ṭov"; Jacob Tam in his Sefer haYashar; RaSHBaM in his commentary on the Pentateuch; Ibn Ezra (see above); Tobiah ben Moses the Karaite in his Yehi Me'orot; Isaac ben Abba Mari in his Sefer haIṭṭur; Isaac ben Moses in his Or Zarua; Zedekiah ben Abraham (see above); Judah ben Eliezer in his Minḥat Yehudah; Eliezer ben Nathan in his piyyut Lel Shimmurim; and numerous later Biblical commentators, halakhists, and Talmudists.

It will thus be seen that Lekach Tov was considered as an authority by the German, French, and Italian, but not by the earlier Spanish, scholars. Of the latter Ibn Ezra alone mentions it, disparagingly. But later Spanish authorities who, after the expulsion, settled in the East considered Lekach Tov as the chief source for their works.

=== Publication ===
Only that part of Tobiah's work covering Leviticus, Numbers, and Deuteronomy was edited in Venice, 1546. The same part was afterward reedited with a Latin translation under the title "Pesikta" by Ugolino; and was subsequently republished by Aaron Moses Padua under the title Midrash Lekach Tov (Wilna, 1880), with a short commentary or "bi'ur." Four years later the part comprising Genesis and Exodus was published, also under the title Midrash Lekach Tov, by Solomon Buber (Wilna, 1884), who added a long introduction and copious notes. The commentary on Lamentations was edited by Nacht, and that on the Book of Ruth by Bamberger (Mainz, 1887).

== Poems ==
Tobiah is known as a Hebrew poet through four poems of his which are still extant. One is an introduction to his commentary on Genesis, another is an epilogue to the same, both being acrostics on "Tobiah bar Eliezer Ḥazaḳ"; a third is a short acrostic on "Tobiah," forming an epilogue to Leviticus;and the remaining one is a "seliḥah" beginning "Ehyeh asher Ehyeh," the verses being arranged in alphabetical order, and signed "Tobiah b. Eliezer Ḥazaḳ." The last-cited poem has been published by Solomon Buber at the end of his introduction to Lekach Tov.
