= Jewish Golden Age =

Jewish Golden Age refers to:

- Golden Age of Jews in Spain (8th-12th century)
- Golden Age of Jews in Poland (13th-18th century)
