= Menahem ben Solomon =

Rabbi

Menahem ben Solomon ben Isaac was a rabbi and author of the Sekel Ṭob and the Eben Boḥan.

The presence of twenty-five Italian glosses in his works indicates that he lived in Italy. The Sekel Ṭob, written in 1139 at Rome, is a midrashic compilation on the Pentateuch. The substance of the old midrashim is quoted in smooth and ornate language, from which foreign words are excluded, the general method being that of Tobiah ben Eliezer's Leḳaḥ Ṭob, which is frequently quoted, both with and without acknowledgment.

Menahem's sources, in addition to the Targumim, are the whole of the earlier midrashic literature as well as the literature of geonic mysticism. He interprets also halakic authors, especially Alfasi and R. Hananeel, explaining verses as well as single words literally, although he expressly states that the midrashic interpretation is deeper and more thorough. Sekel Ṭob is frequently quoted both for its exegesis and for its halakic decisions. In the Middle Ages it was still intact, but now only the portion from Gen. xv. 1 to Ex. xi. 2 (edited by Buber, Berlin, 1900) is in existence, in two separate manuscripts in the Bodleian Library.

Of Menahem's other work, the Eben Boḥan, only fragments are extant (Munich MS. No. 55). A part of it has been translated by Dukes, and it has been analyzed in detail by Bacher. This work, completed at Rome in 1143, in five months, was intended to prepare the author's three young sons for the study of the Bible. Menahem undertook to prepare for the first time in Hebrew a comprehensive manual of the Hebrew language and of Biblical exegesis. The work was divided into fifty parts; the first part, by far the largest and most valuable, was a dictionary of the Hebrew language; the other parts, now known only by their chapter-headings, dealt with grammar. The author follows chiefly Menahem ben Saruq; occasionally, and with diffidence, however, he advances his own views, and the entire conception of the form and contents of the work shows a certain degree of independence. It was intended, according to Bacher, to uphold Menahem b. Saruḳ's system against the teachings of Ḥayyuj and Ibn Janaḥ, introduced about that time (1143) into Italy by Abraham ibn Ezra.

== Bibliography ==
- Zunz, Z. G. pp. 71, 108;
- Bacher, Die Hebr. Sprachwissenschaft (Winter and Wünsche, Die Jüdische Litteratur, ii. 185);
- idem, Bibelexegese (ib. ii. 272);
- idem, Einleitung zum Sechel Tob, pp. i., lx., Berlin, 1900;
- Dukes, Kobeẓ 'al-Yad, part 1, Esslingen, 1846;
- Kirchheim, in Orient, Lit. vii. 439;
- Steinschneider, Hebr. Bibl. xvii. 28 et seq., 134 et seq.;
- Bacher, "Der Prüfstein des Menahem b. Salomo", in Grätz Jubelschrift, pp. 94–115.
