= The Myth of the Andalusian Paradise =

2016 non-fiction book about Islamic Spain

The Myth of the Andalusian Paradise: Muslims, Christians, and Jews under Islamic rule in medieval Spain
- First edition
- Author: Dario Fernández-Morera
- Language: English
- Subject: La Convivencia
- Genre: Islamic history
- Publisher: Intercollegiate Studies Institute
- Publication date: February 29, 2016
- Media type: Print (Hardcover, Paperback), E-book
- Pages: 358
- ISBN: 978-1610170956
- OCLC: 1014253105

The Myth of the Andalusian Paradise is a non-fiction book written by Dario Fernández-Morera and published by ISI Books in 2016. In it, the author argues against La Convivencia, the hypothesis that the Spanish Islamic realms (Al-Andalus) were religiously tolerant.

== Background and contents ==
Fernández-Morera is a Cuban-born associate professor at Northwestern University in the United States, specialising in the literature of Miguel Cervantes. ISI Books is the publishing arm of the Intercollegiate Studies Institute, an American conservative think tank.

The author believes that left-wing academics, journalists and politicians misrepresent the tolerance in Al-Andalus to promote their own agendas in modern times. He argues that the Umayyad conquest of Hispania destroyed Visigothic Spain when it was flourishing culturally. He mentions the important role of slavery in al-Andalus, as well as the jizya tax taken from Christians and Jews as part of their dhimmi minority status that was higher than the equivalent zakat tax for Muslims. He details the persecution of religious minorities under the later Almohad and Almoravid dynasties (Almohad doctrine), such as the Almohad emir Abu Yusuf who is said to have boasted that he had destroyed every church and synagogue in his realm.

== Reception ==
Maribel Fierro finds that Fernández-Morera often "lacks first-hand knowledge of his subject matter and has misinterpreted his readings" and his book "will not lead to a better understanding of al-Andalus" but is "useful in understanding how al-Andalus is employed to fight the battles of the present".

David F. Forte, a professor of law at Cleveland State University, wrote that the level of research for the book was "prodigious", but its organisation was poor and it "veers between genuine scholarship, pedantry, and advocacy". He considered that Fernández-Morera held Christians and Muslims to different standards on borrowing from the Roman civilisation and perpetrating slavery. Forte writes that the best research in the book is on how Iberian Christians and Jews dealt with internal rifts in the same era; the Jews against the Karaite sect and the Christians against Arianism.

S. J. Pearce, an associate professor of Spanish and Portuguese at New York University and specialist on medieval Spain, wrote a scathing review of the book. She wrote that "the historian behind The Myth is promoting propaganda traditionally associated with the Spanish far-right", and accused Fernández-Morera of constructing a straw man argument of medieval Islamic tolerance that is not the modern academic consensus. She repeated her criticism in a 44-page chapter in The Extreme Right and the Revision of History.

Trevor Dadson called the book "a definite must-read for anyone interested in medieval Spain". Alberto Ferreiro, medieval history professor of Seattle Pacific University, gave the work a positive review, expressing a desire for a Spanish translation.
