= Abu al-Fadl ibn Hasdai =

Abu al-Fadl ben Yosef Hasdai

Personal life
- Born: c. 1050 Zaragoza, Taifa of Zaragoza
- Died: after 1093 Cairo, Fatimid Caliphate

Religious life
- Religion: Converted to Islam from Judaism

Abu al-Fadl ben Yosef Hasdai (Arabic: أبوالفضل حصداي ابن يوسف ابن حصداي, ʾAbūu al-Faḍl Ḥaṣdāī ibn Yūṣuf ibn Ḥaṣdāī Hebrew: חַסְדַּאי בֶּן יוֹסֵף, Ḥasdai ben Yosef) was an eleventh-century philosopher, poet, mathematician, physician, and political figure in Zaragoza, then under the Taifa of Zaragoza.

He was the son of the poet Joseph ibn Ḥasdai, who had fled from Córdoba in 1013, and the grandson of Ḥasdai ibn Ishaq. In 1066 he was appointed vizier in the Hudid court of Zaragoza, a position he held until Yusuf al-Mu'taman ibn Hud ascended the throne in 1081.
