= Isaac ben Ezra =

Sephardic Jewish rabbi (10th century)

Isaac ben Ezra (full name: Abu Hasdai Yitzhak ben Ezra ibn Shaprut; also known as Isaac ibn Shaprut) was a rabbi active in Jaén during the early tenth century CE. Rabbi Isaac was a very wealthy man and constructed a richly decorated synagogue at Cordoba.

Isaac ben Ezra was the father of the great scholar and statesman Hasdai ibn Shaprut, advisor to the Umayyad caliph of Cordova, Abd ar-Rahman III. Hasdai ibn Shaprut is noted for his translation of Dioscorides' influential work on botany, De Materia Medica into Arabic, from which it became the common intellectual property of the Arabs and of medieval Europe.
