= Menahem ben Saruq =

Spanish-Jewish philologist (c. 920–970)

Menachem ben Saruq

Personal life
- Born: Menahem ben Saruq roughly 920 CE Tortosa, Emirate of Córdoba
- Died: roughly 970 CE (49-50 years old) Córdoba, Caliphate of Córdoba
- Occupation: Poet and Writer

Religious life
- Religion: Judaism
- Profession: Philologist

Menahem ben Saruq (also known as Menahem ben Jacob ibn Saruq, Hebrew: מנחם בן סרוק) was a Spanish-Jewish philologist of the tenth century CE. He was a skilled poet and polyglot. He was born in Tortosa around 920 and died around 970 in Cordoba. Menahem produced an early dictionary of the Hebrew language. For a time he was the assistant of the great Jewish statesman Hasdai ibn Shaprut, and was involved in both literary and diplomatic matters; his dispute with Dunash ben Labrat, however, led to his downfall.

== Early career ==
Menahem was a native of Tortosa of an impoverished family, born around 920 CE, but maybe have been born as early as 910 CE. It is believed that his father was a teacher and that he educated him. At an early age, he went to Cordoba at the behest of Hasdai ibn Shaprut, minister of trade in the court of the Caliph in Córdoba, where he found a patron in Hasdai's father, Isaac ben Ezra. At Isaac's death Menahem eulogized his protector's virtues in an inscription placed in the synagogue which had been built by Isaac at Cordoba. He wrote also elegies on him, which were universally recited during the period of mourning. Menahem then returned to his native city, where he engaged in business.

Hasdai ibn Shaprut, however, recalled Menahem to Cordoba and encouraged him to complete his life-work, a dictionary of the Hebrew language. In other ways also his new patron availed himself of his protégé's literary talents. On his mother's death, Hasdai requested that Menahem compose a dirge; and when Hasdai addressed his questions to the king of the Khazars, Menahem was commissioned to write the letter, which has become an important historical document. Menahem even included both his patron's and his names in an acrostic including the first letter of each line. Menahem, however, carried on his work amid great privations, as Hasdai did not prove a liberal patron.

== Dispute with Dunash ==
The dictionary had scarcely been completed when an opponent to its author arose in Dunash ben Labrat, who had come to Spain from Fez, Morocco, and who wrote a criticism on the work, which he prefaced by a eulogistic dedication to Hasdai. Dunash roused Menahem's enemies, who began to complain to Hasdai of Menahem's alleged wrongs against them. The slanders of his personal enemies likewise seem to have aroused Hasdai's anger against Menahem to such a pitch that the latter, at the command of the powerful statesman, suffered bodily violence, being cast out of his house on the Sabbath day, shamed, and imprisoned. In a touching, and at some points audacious letter to Hasdai (a valuable source from which most of this information has been taken) Menahem, who probably died shortly afterward, complained of the wrong done him and sharply criticized Hasdai. He seems to have made some impression on his patron. Menahem is said to have written another work in answer to the criticisms of Dunash, of which only an excerpt has survived, quoted by Rabbi Profiat Duran.

Menahem's pupils also defended their teacher, and in response to Dunash's criticism wrote a detailed refutation which was marked by polemical acumen and exact grammatical knowledge, today preserved in the ducal library of Parma. Judah ben David Hayyuj, one of these three young scholars who so effectually defended their master, became the founder of scientific Hebrew grammar; another, Isaac ibn Gikatilla, was subsequently, as one of the most learned men of Lucena, the teacher of Jonah ibn Janah. Thus the most flourishing period of Hebrew philology, whose chief representatives were Hayyuj and ibn Janah, began with Menahem's work and teachings.

== Characteristics of his Dictionary ==
Menahem's work was informed by his study of previous grammarian sources such as Judah ibn Kuraish, the Karaites, and the Saadia Gaon. He avoids, however, any open comparison of the language of the Bible with that of the Quran, notwithstanding the precedent furnished him by Saadia and Judah ibn Kuraish, authors whom he quotes in his dictionary. He doubtless refrained from such comparison because of the religious prejudice which then prevented the Spanish Jews from engaging in such linguistic comparisons.

The Mahberet, as Menahem entitled his dictionary, was the first complete lexical treatment of the Biblical vocabulary composed in Hebrew in which the view then prevailing, that there were both uniliteral and biliteral roots, was definitely systematized and worked out. This theory was set aside later by Menahem's own pupil, Hayyuj, who correctly assumed the triliteral character of Hebrew roots; but, because it was written in Hebrew, Menahem's dictionary remained for a long time the chief source of philological instruction for Jews who were unacquainted with Arabic, especially, therefore, for those in the Christian countries of Europe. Thus Rashi in the second half of the eleventh century refers to Menahem as a philological authority; Rashi's grandson, Jacob b. Meïr Tam, composed a work for the special purpose of vindicating Menahem against the attacks of Dunash; and (about 1140) Menahem ben Solomon composed in Italy a dictionary which was based for the most part on the "Mahberet."

Regarding the grammatical importance of Menahem ben Saruq's work, it may be noted that, although he had no systematic knowledge of the forms of the language, yet he recognized throughout his lexicon that there are inviolable laws underlying the language, and that its forms and phenomena are subject to definite rules. This insight, which appears in the terminology he employs, bridges the apparent chasm between him and his pupil Hayyuj. As Menahem composed his work in Hebrew, he could not use the terminology of the Arabic grammarians; yet he tacitly adopted some of their terms, translating them into Hebrew, and explained some words, although without acknowledging it, on the analogy of kindred Arabic expressions.

=== Editions ===
Menahem ben Saruq's dictionary was edited by Filipowski (London, 1854), and addenda from the Bern manuscript of the "Mahberet" were published by D. Kaufmann in "Z. D. M. G." xl. 367-409. The defense by Menahem's pupils was edited by S. G. Stern in "Liber Responsionum" (Vienna, 1870), where Menahem's letter to Hasdai ibn Shaprut (first edited by Luzzatto in "Bet ha-Ozar") is reprinted (pp. xxiii-xxxvii).

This edition, already previously supplanted by Saenz-Badillos, Angel. Menahem Ben Saruq: Mahberet [Hebrew and Spanish]. Granada: Universidad de Granada, Unversidad Pontificia de Salamanca, 1986, has now itself been supplanted by Maman, Aaron, and Mirsky, Hananel. The Maḥberet of Menaḥem Ben Saruq : Annotated Critical Edition. Jerusalem: Academy of Hebrew Language, 2023.

== Bibliography ==
- S. Gross, Menahem b. Saruk, Berlin, 1872;
- Bacher, in Winter and Wünsche, Jüdische Litteratur, ii.145-149;
- id., Die Anfänge der Hebräischen Grammatik, pp. 70–95;
- Dukes, Beiträge zur Gesch. der Aeltesten Auslegung und Spracherklärung des A. T. ii.119 et seq.;
- Grätz, Gesch. 1st ed., v.372 et seq.;
- Geiger, Das Judenthum und Seine Gesch. ii.87 et seq.;
- Jüdische Zeitschrift, ix.65, x.81;
- Drachman, Die Stellung und Bedeutung des Jehudah Hajjug in der Gesch. der Hebräischen Grammatik, pp. 17–27, Breslau, 1885;
- Weiss, Dor, iv.228-234;
- Steinschneider, Cat. Bodl. col. 1738.
