= Convivencia =

Period of religious tolerance in Iberia

Convivencia (Spanish for "living together") is a term used by scholar Américo Castro to characterize a period in Spanish history from the Muslim Umayyad conquest of Hispania in the 700s to the expulsion of the Jews in 1492 by the Catholic Monarchs of Spain. This characterization considers the country's hegemonic religion to have switched from Islam to Christianity starting in 1252 with the reign of Alfonso X of Castile. It claims that in the different Moorish Iberian kingdoms, the Muslims, Christians and Jews lived in relative peace. It further suggests that medieval Spain was a place of religious tolerance and cultural exchange-very different from later periods when only Catholicism was allowed.

However, some scholars have challenged the historicity of the above view of intercultural harmony, depicting it as a myth, and claiming that it is ahistorical. According to The Oxford Dictionary of the Middle Ages, "Critics charge that [the term 'convivencia'] too often describes an idealized view of multi-faith harmony and symbiosis, while supporters retort that such a characterization is a distortion of the complex interactions they seek to understand."

== Historiography according to The Spaniards: an Introduction to their History ==
In a review of Castro's 1948 seminal work introducing the term by Spanish historian Antonio Tovar, the period's historiography was described in the following manner:

RIGHT from the subtitle, this book clearly establishes its position. The author advances the following thesis: 'The Spaniard has been made from within and throughout the history of his living, and not upon racial assumptions' (p. 44); what is Spanish appears to him 'with an aspect and a form whose meaning I cannot trace prior to the year 711' (p. 12); 'the history (of Spain) between the 10th and 15th centuries was a Christian-Islamic-Jewish contexture' (p. 471). (Note: Excerpt 1 Spanish original: DESDE el subtítulo, este libro plantea claramente su posición. El autor arrostra la siguiente tesis: «El español se ha hecho desde dentro y a lo largo de la historia de su vivir, y no sobre supuestos raciales» (p. 44); lo español se le aparece «con un aspecto y una forma cuyo sentido no puedo rastrear con anterioridad al año 711» (p. 12); «la historia (de España) entre los siglos X y XV fue una contextura cristiano-islámico-judía'» (p. 471).)

'The Visigothic life —Castro textually states— created nothing with an unmistakably Spanish stamp, and when it disappeared in 711, nothing peculiarly French or Italian existed either —if we do not allow ourselves to be seduced by retrospective mirages—. By the year 1000, on the contrary, Christian Spain was already in essence what it would be in the year 1600, and was distinguished with sharp clarity from France and Italy' (p. 11). It is, therefore —and we venture to see a Romanist prejudice here in the author—, in the years spanning from 711 to 1000 when the genius of Spain acquires its characteristics: 'the Spaniard after the 8th century ended up carving out an existence connected to a transcendent world, founded on belief and never on thought, and at the same time encapsulated in the consciousness of their total and empirical persona. The horizon of those people was their belief... Thought was almost entirely absent from that way of life. Anxiety over what ought to be, over conduct with a view toward a moral future, occupied the space left vacant by the curiosity of what being actually was' (p. 13). (Note: Excerpt 2 Spanish original: «La vida visigótica —dice textualmente Castro— nada creó con sello inconfundiblemente español, y cuando desapareció en 711, nada existía tampoco peculiarmente francés o italiano —si no nos dejamos seducir por espejismos retrospectivos—. En el año 1000, por el contrario, la España cristiana era ya en lo esencial, como en el año 1600, y se distinguía con tajante nitidez de Francia e Italia» (p. 11). Es, por consiguiente —y nos permitimos ver aquí un prejuicio de romanista en el autor—, en los años que van de 711 al 1000 cuando el genio de España adquiere sus caracteres: «el español posterior al siglo VIII acabó por labrarse una existencia conexa con un mundo trascendente, fundado en creencia y nunca en pensamiento, y a la vez encapsulada en la conciencia de su persona total y empírica. El horizonte de esas personas fue su creencia... El pensamiento estuvo casi del todo ausente de aquella forma de vida. La inquietud por lo que deba ser, por la conducta con vistas a un futuro moral, ocupó el puesto dejado vacante por la curiosidad de qué fuera el ser» (p. 13).)

"Living while un-living" is a note that Américo Castro points out in our history since the 15th century. The acute awareness of what Spain is and what it is not translates into an anguish "somewhat as if the river would not stop asking itself if its waters are really flowing where they ought to run" (p. 39). It is true that such criticism has always endured in the finest souls, and, almost just yesterday, José Antonio Primo de Rivera gave it profound expression in his "we love Spain because we do not like it," allowing himself to be penetrated by this unrest to a degree that worried some of his companions. (Note: Excerpt 3 Spanish original: «Vivir desviviéndose» es una nota que Américo Castro señala desde el siglo XV en nuestra historia. La aguda conciencia de lo que es España y de lo que no es se traduce en una angustia «algo así como si el río no cesara de preguntarse si sus aguas van realmente per donde deben discurrir» (pág. 39). Es verdad que tal crítica ha perdurado siempre en las almas mejores, y, casi ayer mismo, fosé Antonio Primo de Rivera la dio expresión profunda en su «amamos a España porque no nos gusta», dejándose penetrar de esta inquietud hasta un grado que preocupó a algunos de sus compañeros.)

Chapter V addresses a doctrine that is already well-known, but which takes on its full significance within the book. The theme of Muslim "tolerance" sounds a bit cliché. All religions have their tolerance and their intolerance, and the latter has not been, for example, exclusive to Catholicism. Just as there exists the Inquisition and Yankee Catholicism, there exists the political-religious condemnation of Socrates in the ancient world, alongside a total absence of dogmatism. Failing to recognize this dual possibility of religions leads Castro to sustain theses that we dare to call opportunistic, as ahistorical as certain current climates of opinion: "between the ferocious laws of the Fuero Juzgo against the Jews —he says, p. 211— and the very sweet ones of Alfonso the Wise, lie five hundred years of Islam." The matter is not so simple. On one hand, Alfonso's own father, Saint Ferdinand, seems to have been anything but sweet when applying the laws of the Fuero Juzgo to Jews and heretics; on the other hand, those five hundred years that could be imagined as a time of growing Islamic tolerance witnessed, if we do not remember incorrectly, the total liquidation of Andalusian Mozarabism. (Note: Excerpt 4 Spanish original: El capítulo V recoge una doctrina ya conocida, pero que dentro del libro tiene su pleno alcance. Un poco a tópico suena el tema de la «tolerancia» musulmana. Todas las religiones tienen su tolerancia y su intolerancia, y no ha sido ésta, por ejemplo, exclusiva del catolicismo. Lo mismo que existe la inquisición y el catolicismo yanki, existe la condena político-religiosa de Sócrates en el mundo antiguo, al lado de una ausencia total de dogmatismo. Desconocer esta doble posibilidad de las religiones le lleva a Castro a sostener tesis que nos atreveremos a llamar oportunistas, tan ahistóricas como ciertos ambientes de opinión actuales: «entre las leyes feroces del Fuero Juzgo contra los judíos —dice, pág. 211— y las muy dulces de Alfonso el Sabio median quinientos años de Islam». La cosa no es tan sencilla. Por una parte, el propio padre de Alfonso, San Fernando, parece que no fue nada dulce aplicando las leyes del Fuero juzgo a judíos y herejes; por otra, esos quinientos años que se podían imaginar de creciente tolerancia islámica presenciaron, si no recordamos mal, la liquidación total del mozarabismo andaluz.)

The chapter on the Jews is based on partial, though abundant, documentation, and it certainly seems to us that the resulting conclusions are somewhat exaggerated. Very great is the importance of the Jews in our Middle Ages, but on this point the difference with other European countries is not that large. To the advantage of the Jews, Castro excessively devalues the personality of Alfonso the Wise and that of his other collaborators, both Arab and Christian. While it is true that translating the Bible or the Astronomical Tables into the vernacular tongue is unusual in the West (though in the 13th century vernacularization was a very intense current: let us recall Brunetto Latini or Dante), the book of the Partidas, with its Roman sense of law and its meaning strictly parallel to currents of the era, cannot be explained outside the general work of the Wise King nor, in any way, as a Jewish enterprise. By failing to stop and consider facts like these, this chapter on the Jews is rather a collection of anecdotes ad probandum than a study conducted with rigorous historical criticism. We do not have the authority to make an objective and scientific assessment, but we cannot help but make these observations. It cannot be said that the weakness of peninsular feudalism was due to the Jews (p. 596). That the preoccupation with purity of blood and that the inquisitorial spirit stemmed exclusively from the social phenomenon of the conversos and their influence on the Spanish Church and State is also debatable, as these seem to be complex phenomena. It is true that the racist spirit has often arisen in struggle against the racists par excellence, the Jews, but the issue in the Spain of 1500 is not so simple as to explain it by a single cause alone. (Note: Excerpt 5 Spanish original: El capítulo sobre los judíos se basa en una documentación parcial, aunque abundante, y ciertamente nos parece que el resultado en consecuencias es un tanto exagerado. Muy grande es la importancia de los judíos en nuestra Edad Media, pero no es en este punto tan grande la diferencia con otros países de Europa. En ventaja de los judíos rebaja Castro desmedidamente la personalidad de Alfonso el Sabio y la de sus otros colaboradores, árabes y cristianos. Si es verdad que la traducción a la lengua vulgar de la Biblia o las Tablas Astronómicas es extraña en Occidente (pero en el siglo XII! el vulgarismo fue una corriente muy intensa: recordemos a Brunetto Latini o a Dante), el libro de las Partidas, con su sentido romano del derecho y su significado estrictamente paralelo a corrientes de la época, no se puede explicar fuera de la obra general del Rey Sabio ni, en modo alguno, como una empresa judía. Por no pararse a considerar hechos así, este capítulo de los judíos es más bien una colección de ané anecdotes ad probandum que un estudio hecho con crítica histórica rigurosa. No tenemos autoridad para hacer una apreciación objetiva y científica, pero no podemos menos de hacer estas observaciones. No se puede decir que fue debida a los judíos la debilidad del feudalismo peninsular (pág. 596). Que la preocupación por la limpieza de sangre y que el espíritu inquisitorial provinieran exclusivamente del fenómeno social de los conversos y de su influencia en la Iglesia y el Estado españoles, es también discutible, pues parecen fenómenos complejos. Es verdad que el espíritu racista ha surgido muchas veces en lucha con los racistas por excelencia, los judíos, pero la cuestión en la España de 1500 no es tan sencilla como para explicarla por una causa sola.)

== Cultural meaning ==
Convivencia often refers to the interplay of cultural ideas between the three religious groups and ideas of religious tolerance. James Carroll invokes this concept and indicates that it played an important role in bringing the classics of Greek philosophy to Europe, with translations from Greek to Arabic to Hebrew and Latin. Jerrilynn Dodds references this concept in the spatial orientation seen in architecture that draws on building styles seen in synagogues and mosques.

A good example of Convivencia was the city of Córdoba, Andalusia during the 9th and 10th centuries, when it was part of Al-Andalus (Muslim-ruled Spain). At that time, Cordoba was considered one of the most important cities in the world. Christians and Jews took part in the royal court and contributed to the city's rich intellectual and cultural life. Yale professor María Rosa Menocal, highlights how Cordoba's libraries were a symbol of its advanced society-not just in terms of scholarship, but also as a sign of overall social well-being. The city became a meeting point for knowledge, culture, and different religious traditions.

James L. Heft, the Alton Brooks Professor of Religion at USC, describes Convivencia as one of the “rare periods in history” when the three religions did not either keep “their distance from one another, or were in conflict.” During most of their co-existing history, they have been “ignorant about each other” or “attacked each other.”

== Historical context ==
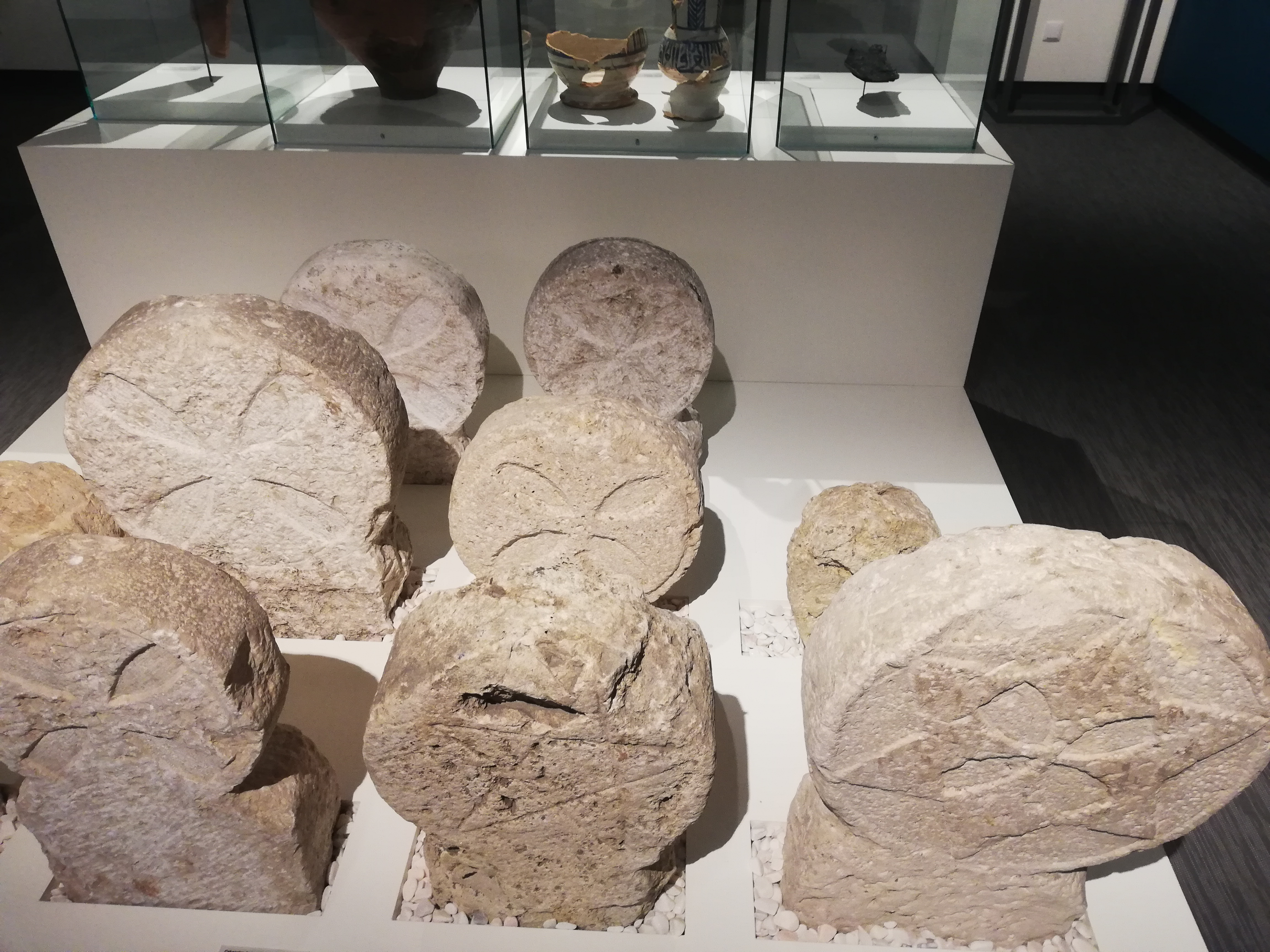
Grave markers from medieval Lisbon, showing Christian crosses, Muslim pentagrams and Jewish Stars of David. (Museu de Lisboa)

Islamic rule in the Iberian Peninsula began in the early 700s, when Arab armies invaded and named the region Al-Andalus. For a time, it was united under the Caliphate of Cordoba, but after the death of its ruler Al-Hakam II in 976, the Caliphate began to break apart into several smaller Muslim states. In the 11th and 12th centuries, two North African Muslim groups-the Almoravids and later the Almohads-briefly reunited parts of Al-Andalus. However, during this same period, Christian Kingdoms in the north began pushing south, gradually reclaiming land in what is known as the Reconquista. By the 1200s, Muslim rule was reduced to just the Emirate of Granada, in the south governed by the Nasrid dynasty, which lasted until 1492.

== Beginning of the Convivencia ==
Comparing the treatment of Jews in the medieval Islamic world and medieval Christian Europe, the Jews were far more integrated in the political and economic life of Islamic society, and usually faced far less violence from Muslims, but there were some instances of persecution in the Islamic world as well from the 11th century. The Islamic world classified Jews and Christians as dhimmis and allowed Jews to practice their religion more freely than they could in Christian Europe.

Other authors criticize the modern notion of Al-Andalus being a tolerant society of equal opportunities for all religious groups as a "myth". Jews were living in an uneasy coexistence with Muslims and Catholics, and the relationship between the groups was more often than not marked by segregation and mutual hostility. In the 1066 Granada massacre of much of the Jewish population of the city, the Jewish death toll was higher than in the much-publicized Christian pogroms in the Rhineland slightly later.

== Middle of the Convivencia ==
The Almohad Muslim dynasty had taken control of the Almoravid Maghribi and Andalusian territories by 1147. It rejected the mainstream Islamic doctrine that established the status of dhimmi, a Non-Muslim resident of a Muslim country who was allowed to practice his religion on condition of submission to Muslim rule and payment of jizya. It forced Christians and Jews to convert, and forced Muslims into their interpretation of the faith. Among those who chose exile rather than conversion or death was the Jewish philosopher Maimonides.

== End of the Convivencia ==
While the Reconquista was ongoing, Muslims and Jews who came under Christian control were allowed to practise their religion to some degree. This ended in the late 15th century with the fall of Granada in 1492. Even before this event, the Spanish Inquisition had been established in 1478. In 1492, with the Alhambra decree, those Jews who had not converted to Catholicism were expelled. Many Jews settled in Portugal, where they were expelled in 1497.

Following a failed revolt in Granada in 1499, the Muslims in Granada and in the Crown of Castile were forced to convert, face death, or be expelled. This happened as the treaty assuring religious freedom at the time of Granada's surrender in 1492 was seen as voided by the rebellion. Between 1500 and 1502 all remaining Muslims of Granada and Castile were converted. In 1525, Muslims in Aragon were similarly forced to convert. The Muslim communities who converted became known as Moriscos. Still they were suspected by the old Christians of being crypto-Muslims and so between 1609 and 1614 their entire population of 300,000 was forcibly expelled. All these expulsions and conversions resulted in Catholic Christianity becoming the sole sanctioned religion in the Iberian Peninsula.

As Anna Akasoy has summarized in a review article, Menocal "argues that the narrow-minded forces that brought about its end were external", both from the North African Muslim Almoravids and Almohads, and Christian northerners.

== Major groups ==
- Converso (Jewish converts to Catholism)
  - Marrano
- Moors (Muslims in Al-Andalus)
- Morisco (Muslim converts to Catholism)
- Mozarab (Christians in Al-Andalus)
- Mudéjar (Muslims in Christendom)
- Muwallad (Christian converts to Islam)
- Sephardim (Jews in Iberia)

== Debate ==
The idea of convivencia has had supporters and detractors from the time Castro first proposed it. Hussein Fancy has summarized the underlying assumptions on both sides of the debate: "The convivencia debates were never about political ideologies or partisan politics, as they are often construed, but rather," as Ryan Szpiech has argued, "about fundamental and unresolved methodological and philosophical issues. While Castro appealed to philosophical interpretivism, [Claudio] Sánchez-Albornoz appealed to scientific positivism."

David Nirenberg challenged the significance of the age of "convivencia," claiming that far from a "peaceful convivencia" his own work "demonstrates that violence was a central and systemic aspect of the coexistence of majority and minority in medieval Spain, and even suggests that coexistence was in part predicated on such violence".

Some critics of the concept of Convivencia point to the execution of the Martyrs of Córdoba during the 850s as a challenge.

Mark Cohen, professor of Near Eastern studies at Princeton University, in his Under Crescent and Cross, calls the idealized interfaith utopia a myth that was first promulgated by Jewish historians such as Heinrich Graetz in the 19th century as a rebuke to Christian countries for their treatment of Jews. This myth was met with what Cohen calls the "counter-myth" of the "neo-lachrymose conception of Jewish-Arab history" by Bat Yeor and others, which also "cannot be maintained in the light of historical reality". Cohen aims to present a correction to both these "myths".

The Spanish medievalist Eduardo Manzano Moreno wrote that the concept of convivencia has no support in the historical record [“el concepto de convivencia no tiene ninguna apoyatura histórica“]. He further states that there is scarcely any information available on the Jewish and Christian communities during the Caliphate of Cordoba, and that this may come as a shock in view of the huge clout of the convivencia meme [“... quizá pueda resultar chocante teniendo en cuenta el enorme peso del tópico convivencial.”] According to Manzano, Castro's conception "was never converted into a specific and well-documented treatment of al-Andalus, perhaps because Castro never succeeded in finding in the Arabist bibliography materials suitable for incorporation into his interpretation.”

Aaron Hughes adds that "contemporary ecumenicists appeal to the 'Golden Age' of tolerance" in the 10th and 11th centuries in Córdoba under Muslim rule, but, for the most part, they are not interested in what actually happened among the Jews, Christians, and Muslims. Rather, they mention "tolerance", a concept that "would have had little or no meaning" at that time.

== See also ==
- Al-Andalus (Moorish-governed Iberia)
- Pablo Alvaro (a Jewish convert to Catholicism)
- Bishop Bodo (a Catholic convert to Judaism)
- Golden age of Jewish culture in Spain
- Islamic Golden Age
- Timeline of the Muslim presence in the Iberian Peninsula
- Muslim conquests
- Golden Age of Jewish culture in Spain

== Sources and further reading ==
- Ariel, Yaakov: “Was there a Golden Age of Christian-Jewish Relations?” Presentation at a Conference at Boston College, April 2010.
- Catlos, Brian. The Victors and the Vanquished • Christians and Muslims of Catalonia and Aragon, 1050–1300, 2004. ISBN 0-521-82234-3.
- Esperanza Alfonso, Islamic culture through Jewish eyes : al-Andalus from the tenth to twelfth century; 2007, ISBN 978-0-415-43732-5.
- Fernández-Morera, Darío : "The Myth of the Andalusian Paradise"; in: the Intercollegiate Review, Fall 2006, pp. 23–31.
- Mann, Vivian B., Glick, Thomas F., Dodds, & Jerrilynn Denise, Convivencia: Jews, Muslims, and Christians in Medieval Spain. G. Braziller, 1992. ISBN 0-8076-1286-3.
- O'Shea, Stephen. Sea of Faith: Islam and Christianity in the Medieval Mediterranean World. Walker & Company, 2006. ISBN 0-8027-1517-6.
- Pick, Lucy. Conflict and Coexistence: Archbishop Rodrigo and the Muslims and Jews of Medieval Spain. Oxbow Books, 2004. ISBN 0-472-11387-9.
- María Rosa Menocal, Ornament of the World • How Muslims, Jews, and Christians Created a Culture of Tolerance in Medieval Spain, 2003. ISBN 0-316-56688-8.
- Boum, Aomar. The Performance of Convivencia: Communities of Tolerance and the Reification of Toleration. Religion Compass 6/3 (2012): 174–184, 10.1111/j.1749-8171.2012.00342.x
