= Hasdai ibn Shaprut =

10th century Jewish scholar and official

- חסדאי אבן שפרוט
- Born: 915; Jaén, Al-Andalus (modern-day Spain)
- Died: c. 970 (60 years); Córdoba, Al-Andalus (modern-day Spain)
- Occupations: minister, scholar, physician
- Era: Golden age of Jewish culture in Spain

Hasdai ibn Shaprut (Hebrew: חסדאי אבן שפרוט; Arabic: حسداي بن شبروط, romanized: Abu Yusuf ibn Shaprut), also known as Abu Yusuf ben Yitzhak ben Ezra, was a Jewish scholar, physician, diplomat, and patron of science in medieval al-Andalus (c. 915–970).

He served as a minister at the court of Caliph Abd al-Rahman III of Córdoba, where he was responsible for foreign affairs and diplomacy. Renowned for his medical expertise, most famously for treating the obesity of Sancho of León, he is also remembered for overseeing the Arabic translation of De Materia Medica by Dioscorides, which became a cornerstone of medieval pharmacology.

== Biography ==
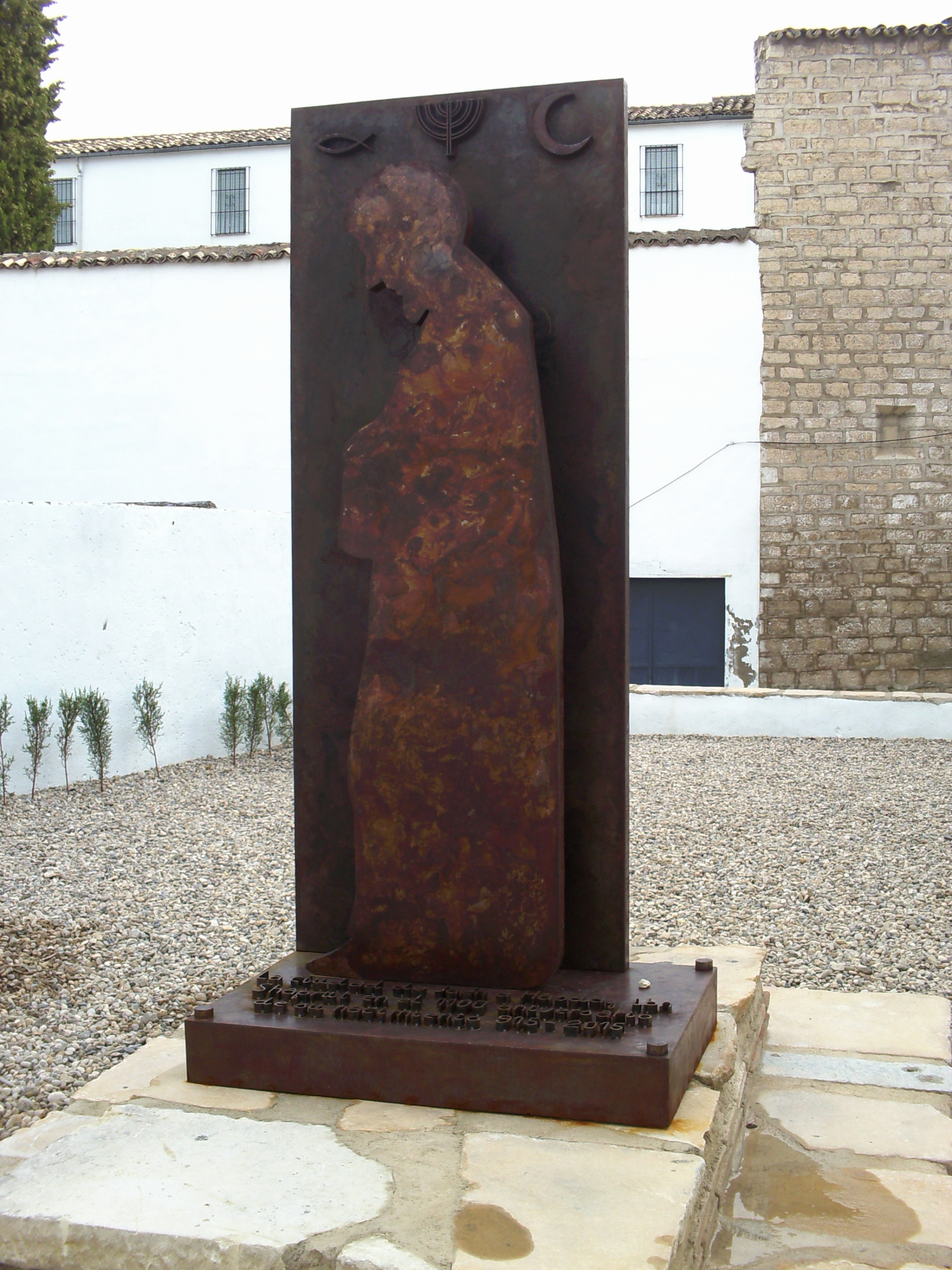
Monument to Hasdai ibn Shaprut in Jaén, Spain

Hasdai was born around 915 in Jaén, and his father, Isaac ben Ezra, was a wealthy and learned Jew. Hasdai acquired in his youth a thorough knowledge of Hebrew, Arabic, and Latin, the latter being known only to the higher clergy of Spain at the time. He also studied medicine.

Appointed physician to Caliph Abd-ar-Rahman III (912–961), he, by his engaging manners, knowledge, character, and extraordinary ability, gained his master's confidence to such a degree that he became the caliph's confidant and faithful counselor. Without bearing the title of vizier he was in reality minister of foreign affairs; he had also control of the customs and ship-dues in the port of Córdoba. Hasdai arranged the alliances formed by the caliph with foreign powers, and he received the envoys sent by the latter to Córdoba.

=== As a physician ===
Hasdai ibn Shaprut is said to have discovered a panacea, called Al-Faruk.

Hasdai ibn Shaprut gained renown in al-Andalus for his medical expertise, described by the 11th-century Toledan qadi Said al-Andalusi as a physician "whose cures were successful and his praise on everyone's lips." He is known for successfully treating the obesity of Sancho of León, the grandson of the queen of Navarre. One of his most notable contributions to medicine was overseeing the Arabic translation of De Materia Medica by Dioscorides, a foundational Greek work on pharmacology, thereby helping to establish it as the standard reference text in both the Islamic world and medieval Europe.

=== As minister ===
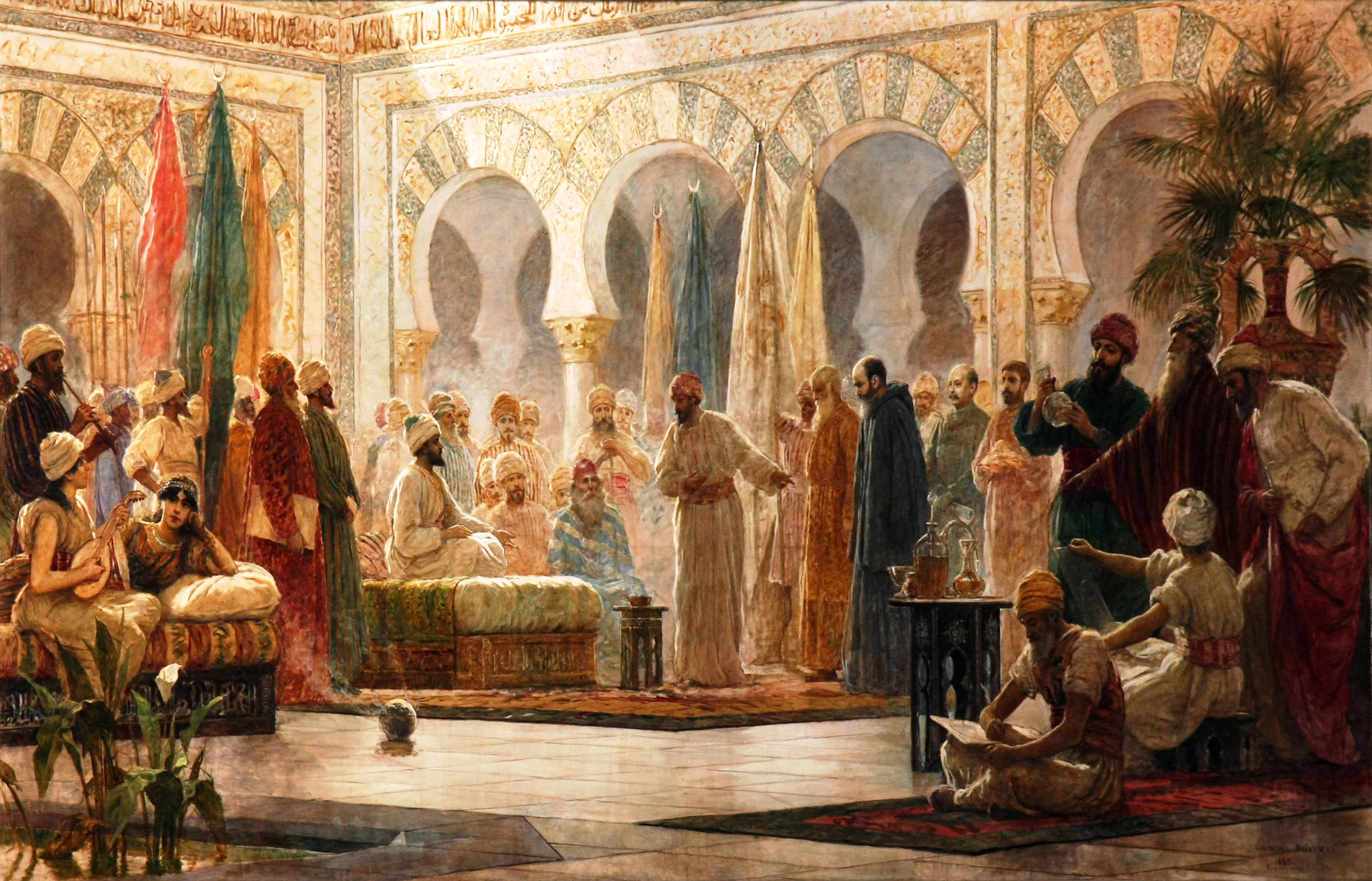
Hasdai ibn Shaprut presenting ambassador John of Gorze of Otto I the Great to Abd al-Rahman III at the Medina Azahara, by Dionisio Baixeras Verdaguer, 1885.

Hasdai rendered important services to the caliph by his treatment of an embassy headed by John of Gorze, sent to Córdoba in 956 by Otto I. The caliph, fearing that the letter of the German emperor might contain matter derogatory to Islam, commissioned Hasdai to open the negotiations with the envoys. Hasdai, who soon perceived that the letter could not be delivered to the caliph in its present form, persuaded the envoys to send for another letter which should contain no objectionable matter. John of Gorze said that he had "never seen a man of such subtle intellect as the Jew Hasdeu".

Hasdai secured a great diplomatic triumph during the difficulties which arose between the kingdoms of León and Navarre, when the ambitious Queen Toda of Pamplona sought the aid of Abd ar-Rahman in reinstating her deposed grandson, Sancho I of León. Hasdai was sent to the court of Navarre; and he succeeded after a long struggle in persuading the queen to go to Córdoba with her son and grandson, in order to prostrate herself before the caliph, her old enemy, and implore the aid of his arms (958). The proud Navarrese allowed herself to be convinced by Hasdai – as a Jewish poet of the time expressed himself - "by the charm of his words, the strength of his wisdom, the force of his cunning, and his thousand tricks."

In 949, an embassy was sent by Constantine VII to form a diplomatic league between the hard-pressed Byzantine Empire and the powerful ruler of Spain. Among the presents brought by the embassy was a magnificent codex of Pedanius Dioscorides' work on botany, which the Arabic physicians and naturalists valued highly. Hasdai, with the aid of a learned Greek monk named Nicholas, translated it into Arabic, making it thereby the common property of the Arabs and of medieval Europe.

Hasdai retained his high position under 'Abd ar-Rahman's son and successor, al-Hakam II, who even surpassed his father in his love for science.

=== Jewish activity ===
Hasdai was very active on behalf of his co-religionists and Jewish science. Allegedly, when he heard that there was a Jewish state with a Jewish ruler in Central Asia, he desired to enter into correspondence with this monarch. When the report of the existence of the Khazar state was confirmed by two Jews, Mar Saul and Mar Joseph, who had come in the retinue of an embassy from the Croatian king to Córdoba, Hasdai entrusted to them a letter, written in good Hebrew addressed to the Jewish king, in which he gave an account of his position in the Western state, described the geographical situation of Andalusia and its relation to foreign countries, and asked for detailed information regarding the Khazars, their origin, their political and military organization, etc. Historian Shaul Stampfer has questioned the authenticity of the letter said to have been received from the Khazar king, citing numerous linguistic and geographic oddities amid a flourishing of pseudo-historiographic texts and forgeries in medieval Spain.

In his correspondence with the king of the Khazars, Hasdai ibn Shaprut mentioned that, in the time of his forebears, a Jew claiming descent from the tribe of Dan (identified with the traveler Eldad ha-Dani) had arrived in Spain, speaking exclusively in biblical Hebrew.

Hasdai sent a letter to Empress Helena of Byzantium in which he pleaded for religious liberty for the Jews of Byzantium. He pointed to his own warm relations with the Muslim Caliph in Córdoba as well as his benevolent attitude towards the Christians of Spain.

Hasdai sent rich presents to the talmudic academies in Babylonia and corresponded with Dosa, the son of Saadia Gaon. He was also instrumental in transferring the center of Jewish theological studies from Lower Mesopotamia to the Iberian Peninsula. Moses ben Hanoch, from Sura Academy, had been captured by pirates off of Italy, ransomed by Iberian Jews, and was brought to Córdoba. Hasdai appointed him director of a school, thereby detaching Judaism from its dependence on the Jews of the Abbasid Caliphate, to the great joy of the caliph, as Abraham ibn Daud said in Sefer ha-Kabbalah p. 68. Ibn Abi Usaybi'a wrote about him in his biographical encyclopedia, "Hasdai b. Isaac was among the foremost Jewish scholars versed in their law. He opened to his co-religionists in Andalusia the gates of knowledge of the religious law, of chronology, etc. Before his time they had to apply to the Jews of Baghdad on legal questions, and on matters referring to the calendar and the dates of the festivals" (ed. Müller, ii. 50).

Hasdai marks the beginning of the florescence of Andalusi Jewish culture and the rise of poetry and the study of Hebrew grammar. Himself a scholar, he encouraged scholarship among his coreligionists by the purchase of Hebrew books, which he imported from the East, and by supporting Jewish scholars whom he gathered about him. Among the latter was Menahem ben Saruq of Tortosa, the protégé of Hasdai's father, as well as Dunash ben Labrat, both of whom addressed poems to their patron. Dunash, however, prejudiced Hasdai to such a degree against Menahem that Hasdai caused Menahem to be maltreated.

== Personal life ==
There is no record of Shaprut having a wife. The family came from either Byzantium or Armenia (now Turkey or Armenia) and many that have the surname Chiprut claim descent from Hasdai. In addition, several families throughout the Jewish Diaspora carry variations of the Hasdai name which came about when moving from one country to another [i.e.: Hazday, Hazdai, Hasday, Hazbay].

He died circa 970 in Córdoba.

== See also ==
- Golden age of Jewish culture in Spain – Historical period of Jewish intellectual and cultural flourishing in medieval al-Andalus
- Kuzari – Philosophical work by Judah Halevi that also refers to the Khazars
- Menahem ben Saruq – Jewish poet and philologist who served as secretary to Hasdai ibn Shaprut and was one of the earliest Hebrew lexicographers
- Samuel HaNagid – another prominent Jewish statesman who held high office under Muslim rule in medieval Spain
