= Bostanai =

Jewish leader in Mesopotamia (c.599–670)

Bustanai בוסתנאי بوستني
- Ras al Jalut
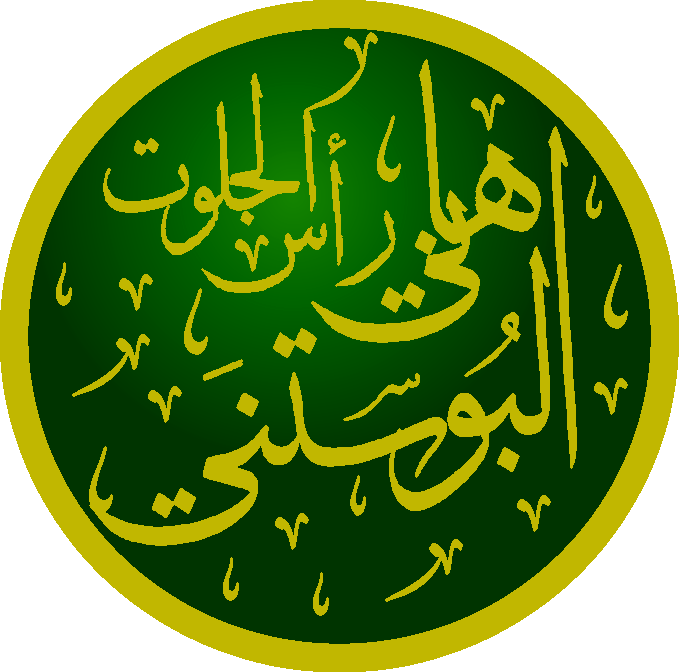
- Calligraphical depiction of Bustanai

Exilarch in the Rashidun Caliphate
- Reign: 642–670
- Predecessor: Heman
- Successor: Hisdai I
- Born: c. 599 CE; Ctesiphon, Sasanian Empire
- Died: c. 670 (aged 70–71); Medina, Hejaz, Arabia
- Burial: Ramallah, Rashidun Caliphate
- Spouse: Izdundad (Sister of Shahrbanu)
- Issue: Hisdai I; Haninai Bar Adai; Shahriyar
- Dynasty: Davidic Dynasty
- Father: Haninai ben Hofnai (Kulthum Ar Rabi')
- Religion: Judaism
- Arabic name
- Personal (Ism): Hani'
- Patronymic (Nasab): Hani' ibn Kulthum Ar-Rabi

Bostanai (Hebrew: בוסתנאי), also transliterated as Bustanai or Bustnay, also known by his personal name Haninai (Hani' in Arabic), was the first Exilarch (leader of the Jewish community of Mesopotamia) under Arab rule. He lived in the early-to-middle of the 7th century, and died about AD 670. The name is Aramaized from the Persian bustan or bostan (Persian : بوستان), meaning "Garden". Bostanai is the only Dark Age Babylonian Exilarch of whom anything more than a footnote is known. He is frequently made the subject of Jewish legends.

According to the Maaseh Beth David, Bostanai was confirmed in his office as exilarch by the Caliph Ali, no earlier then 656. The Caliph granted him the authority to appoint civil judges, and heads of the rabbinical academies at Sura, Pumbedita and Nehardea.

== Family of Bostanai ==
Bostanai was the posthumous son of a former exilarch, Haninai and his wife who is known as 'the daughter of Hananiah' in the Seder Olam Zutta, of whom little to nothing is known historically.

Hai ben Sharira seems to identify Bostanai with Haninai, and tells that he was given for wife a daughter of the Sasanian Emperor Khosrow II (died 628), by the Rashidun Caliph Umar (died 644). Abraham ibn Daud, however, says that it was the last Sasanian emperor, Yazdegerd III (born 624; died 651-652), who gave his daughter to Bostanai. But in that case it could have been only Calif Ali (656-661), and not Omar, who thus honored the exilarch. It is known also that Ali gave a friendly reception to the contemporary Gaon Isaac; and it is highly probable, therefore, that he honored the exilarch in certain ways as the official representative of the Jews.

The name of his Jewish wife is unknown in any record, and there are conflicting reports regarding the names of his children. A certain Rabbi Zakkai is mentioned by Benjamin of Tudela as being his son, albeit only in passing. Another son, Hasdai I, is mentioned in the Seder Olam Zutta as succeeding him to the office of exilarch, as well as Baradoi, both children of his Jewish wife. Bostanai allegedly had three children by his Persian wife, at least one son, whose name is given as Shahriyar would go on to be the ancestor of other exilarchs.

Later in life Bostanai would assume the role of Gaon of the rabbinical academy at Pumbedita.

== The Dispute among his Heirs ==
The relation of Bostanai to the Persian princess called "Dara" or "Azdad-war" had an unpleasant familial outcome. The exilarch lived with her without having married her, and according to the rabbinical law she should previously have received her "letter of freedom," for, being a prisoner of war, she had become an Arabian slave, and as such had been presented to Bostanai.

After Bostanai's death, the legitimacy of the children that he had with her was questioned as a matter of inheritance. The children of his Jewish wife insisted that the princess and her son were still slaves and hence, their property. The judges were divided in opinion, but finally decided that the legitimate sons of the exilarch should grant letters of manumission to the princess and her son in order to testify to their emancipation. This decision was based on the ground that Bostanai had probably lived in legitimate marriage with this woman, and, although there were no proofs, had presumably first emancipated and then married her.

Nevertheless, the descendants of the princess were not recognized as legitimate 300 years afterward. The statement in the genizah specimen (see bibliography below) is doubtless dictated by enmity to the exilarch; Abraham ibn Daud's statement is contrariwise prejudiced in favor of the exilarch; but compare genizah fragment published by Schechter.

== Rabbinical Legends about Bostanai ==
The name "Bostanai" gave rise to the following legend: The last Sasanian emperor, Hormizd VI, inimical to the Jews, decided to extinguish the royal house of David, no one being left of that house but a young woman whose husband had been killed shortly after his marriage, and who was about to give birth to a child. Then the king dreamed that he was in a beautiful garden ("bostan"), where he uprooted the trees and broke the branches, and, as he was lifting up his ax against a little root, an old man snatched the ax away from him and gave him a blow that almost killed him, saying: "Are you not satisfied with having destroyed the beautiful trees of my garden, that you now try to destroy also the last root? Truly, you deserve that your memory perish from the earth." The king thereupon promised to guard the last plant of the garden carefully. No one but an old Jewish sage was able to interpret the dream, and he said: "The garden represents the Davidic line, all of whose descendants you have destroyed except a woman with her unborn boy. The old man whom you saw was David, to whom you promised that you would take care that his house should be renewed by this boy." The Jewish sage, who was the father of the young woman, brought her to the king, and she was assigned to rooms fitted up with princely splendor, where she gave birth to a boy, who received the name "Bostanai," from the garden ("bostan") which the king had seen in his dream.

The veracity of this account was disputed by Sherira ben Hanina who claimed his own lineage traces to a pre-Bostanaian branch of the Davidic line.

== Bostanai at the Court of the King ==
The figure of the wasp in the escutcheon of the exilarch was made the subject of another legend. The king had taken delight in the clever boy, and, spending one day with him, saw, as he stood before him, a wasp sting him on the temple. The blood trickled down the boy's face, yet he made no motion to chase the insect away. The king, upon expressing astonishment at this, was told by the youth that in the house of David, of which he had come, they were taught, since they themselves had lost their throne, neither to laugh nor to lift up the hand before a king, but to stand in motionless respect. The king, moved thereby, showered favors upon him, made him an exilarch, and gave him the power to appoint judges of the Jews and the heads of the three academies, Nehardea, Sura, and Pumbedita. In memory of this Bostanai introduced a wasp into the escutcheon of the exilarchate.

The genizah fragment says that the incident with the wasp occurred in the presence of the calif Omar, before whom Bostanai as a youth of sixteen had brought a dispute with a sheikh, who filled his office during the exilarch's minority, and then refused to give it up. Bostanai was exilarch when Persia fell into the hands of the Arabians, and when Ali came to Babylon Bostanai went to meet him with a splendid retinue, whereby the calif was so greatly pleased that he asked for Bostanai's blessing. The calif, on learning that Bostanai was not married, gave him Dara, the daughter of the Persian king, as wife; and the exilarch was permitted to make her a Jew and to marry her legitimately. They had many children, but their legitimacy was assailed after their father's death by the exilarch's other sons ("Ma'aseh Bostanai," several times printed under different titles). This legend was made known only in the 16th century (compare Isaac Akrish), but the Seder 'Olam Zuṭṭa, composed in the beginning of the 9th century, drew upon the legends of the garden and the wasp (see Mar Zutra II).

The name "Dara" for the Persian princess in Christian sources occurs also as that of Chosroes' daughter. The legend glorifying Bostanai probably originated in Babylon, while the genizah fragment, branding all the descendants of Bostanai as illegitimate, being descendants of a slave and unworthy to fill high office, comes from Palestine. This latter view is of course erroneous, as may be gathered from Hai's remark, above mentioned, for the post-Bostanaite house of exilarchs was not descended from the princess. It is true, however, that the Bostanaites were hated by the scholars and the pious men, probably in part because Anan, founder of the Karaite etc., was a descendant of Bostanai. Benjamin of Tudela says that he was shown the grave of Bostanai near Pumbedita.

== Cultural references ==
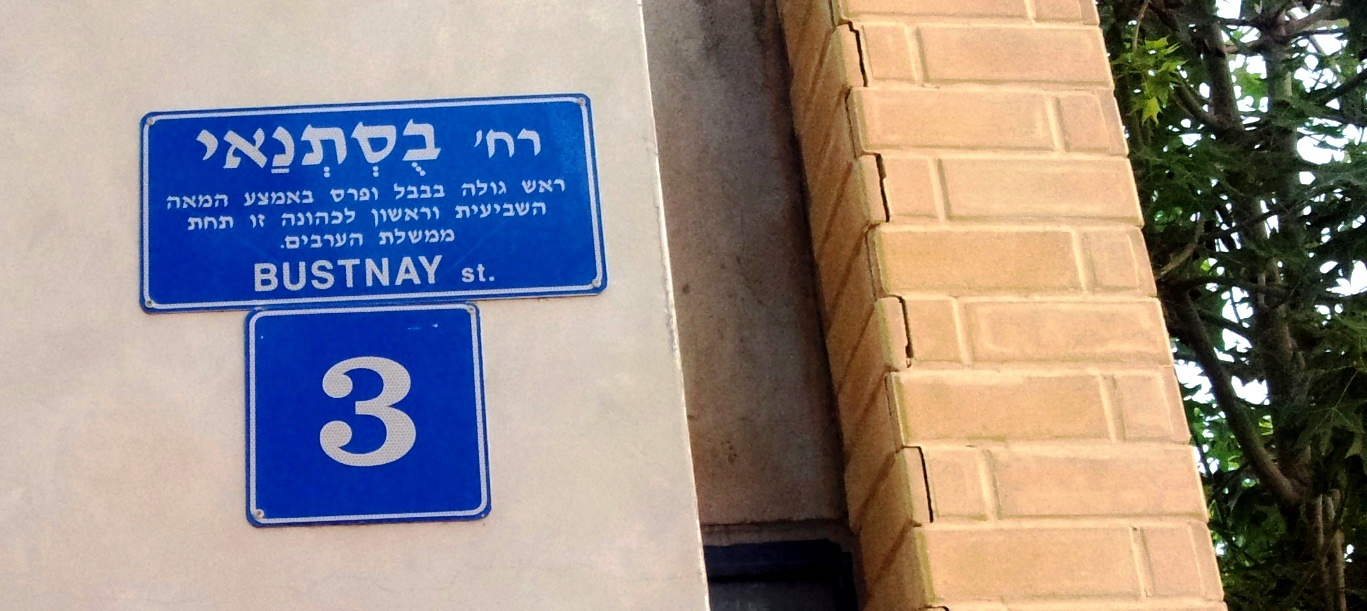
A street sign for Bostanai street

There is a street in the Katamon community in the city of Jerusalem named after the exilarch Bostanai.

== Descendants of Bostanai ==
- Hasdai I ben Bustanai, Exilarch & Gaon (Hebrew) of the Academy at Sura, Syria
- David II, Exilarch
- Solomon ben Hisdai, Exilarch
- Haninai II ben Baradoi, Exilarch
- Joseph ben Jacob, Gaon of Sura
- Anan ben David, founder of Karaite Judaism
- Hezekiah Gaon, Exilarch and Gaon of Pumbedita
- Makhir of Narbonne, Jewish Scholar
- Samuel ibn Naghrillah, Sephardic poet and politician
- Joseph ibn Naghrela, Vizier of Granada
- Hiyya al-Daudi, Poet and Gaon of Andalusia
- Yaish Ibn Yahya, advisor to king Afonso I of Portugal
- Yahia Ben Rabbi, Portuguese Knight
- Yahia Ben Yahi III, Chief Rabbi of Portugal
- Mordecai Meisel, mayor of the Prague Jewish Town in the 16th century

== Notes ==
Preceded by Rav Rabbah	Gaon of the Pumbedita Academy around 670	Succeeded by Huna Mari ben Mar Joseph
