= List of 8th-century religious leaders =

This is a list of the top-level leaders for religious groups with at least 50,000 adherents, and that led anytime from January 1, 701, to December 31, 800. It should likewise only name leaders listed on other articles and lists.

== Christianity ==
- Church of Rome (complete list) –

- Sergius I, Pope (687–701)
- John VI, Pope (701–705)
- John VII, Pope (705–707)
- Sisinnius, Pope (708)
- Constantine, Pope (708–715)
- Gregory II, Pope (715–731)
- Gregory III, Pope (731–741)
- Zachary, Pope (741–752)
- Stephen II, Pope (752–757)
- Paul I, Pope (757–767)
- Stephen III, Pope (768–772)
- Adrian I, Pope (772–795)
- Leo III, Pope (795–816)

- Church of Constantinople (complete list) –

- Callinicus I, Patriarch of Constantinople (693–705)
- Cyrus, Patriarch of Constantinople (705–711)
- John VI, Patriarch of Constantinople (712–715)
- Germanus I, Patriarch of Constantinople (715–730)
- Anastasius, Patriarch of Constantinople (730–754)
- Constantine II, Patriarch of Constantinople (754–766)
- Nicetas I, Patriarch of Constantinople (766–780)
- Paul IV, Patriarch of Constantinople (780–784)
- Tarasius, Patriarch of Constantinople (784–806)

== Islam ==
=== Sunni ===
- Umayyad Caliphate (complete list) –

- Abd al-Malik, Caliph (685–705)
- Al-Walid I, Caliph (705–715)
- Sulayman, Caliph (715–717)
- Umar II, Caliph (717–720)
- Yazid II, Caliph (720–724)
- Hisham, Caliph (724–743)
- Al-Walid II, Caliph (743–744)
- Yazid III, Caliph (744)
- Ibrahim, Caliph (744)
- Marwan II, Caliph (744–750)

- Abbasid Caliphate, Baghdad (complete list) –

- as-Saffah, Caliph (750–754)
- al-Mansur, Caliph (754–775)
- al-Mahdi, Caliph (775–785)
- al-Hadi, Caliph (785–786)
- Harun al-Rashid, Caliph (786–809)

=== Shia ===
- Shia Islam (complete list) –

- Ali ibn Husayn Zayn al-Abidin, Imam (680–712)
- Muhammad al-Baqir, Imam (712–733)
- Ja'far al-Sadiq, Imam (733–765)

- Twelver (Shia Islam) (complete list) –

- Musa al-Kadhim, Imam (765–799)
- Ali al-Ridha, Imam (799–819)

- Isma'ilism (Shia Islam) (complete list) –

- Isma'il ibn Jafar, Imam (to 762) Although he predeceased his father Ja'far al-Sadiq, he is still considered to have been an Imam by Isma'ilis.
- Muhammad ibn Isma'il Imam (765–813)

- Zaidiyyah (complete list)

- Al-Hasan al-Muthanna, Imam (680–706)
- Zayd ibn Ali, Imam (706–740)
- Hasan ibn Zayd ibn Hasan, Imam (740–783)
- Muhammad ibn Ja'far al-Sadiq, Imam (783–818)

== Judaism ==
=== Karaite Judaism ===
- Exilarch (complete list) –

- Anan ben David, major founder and Gaon (c.715–c.795/811)
- Saul ben Anan, Gaon (8th century)

=== Rabbinic Judaism ===
- Exilarch (complete list) –

- Solomon, Exilarch (730–761)

- Pumbedita Academy (complete list) –

- Dodai ben Nahman, Gaon (761–767)
- R. Hananya ben R. Mesharsheya, Gaon (767–771)
- Malka ben R. Aha, Gaon (771–773)
- Abba bar Dudai, Gaon (773–782)
- Rav Shinwai, Gaon (782)
- Haninai Kahana ben Abraham, Gaon (782–786)
- Huna ben ha-Levi ben Isaac, Gaon (786–788)
- Manasseh ben R. Joseph, Gaon (788–796)
- Isaiah ha-Levi ben R. Abba, Gaon (796–798)
- Joseph ben R. Shila, Gaon (798–804)

- Sura Academy (complete list) –

- Achai, Gaon (c.756)
- Yehudai, Gaon (757-761)

- Narbonne

- Makhir of Narbonne, leader (late 8th century)

- Persia

- Abu Isa, prophet (8th century)

== See also ==
- Religious leaders by year
- List of state leaders in the 8th century
- Lists of colonial governors by century
