= Davidic line =

Lineage of the Israelite king David

House of David בֵּית דָּוִד
- Country: Kingdom of Israel (c. 1010 BCE – c. 930 BCE); Kingdom of Judah (c. 930 BCE – c. 587 BCE)
- Origin: Tribe of Judah; Bethlehem
- Founded: c. 1000 BCE
- Founder: David (traditional)
- Final ruler: Zedekiah
- Titles: King of Israel; King of Judah
- Estates: Land of Israel; Jerusalem; First Temple

The Davidic line or the House of David (Hebrew: בֵּית דָּוִד Bēt Dāwīḏ) was, according to the Bible and Jewish and Christian traditions, the line of kings, descended from David, who ruled over the Kingdom of Israel and the Kingdom of Judah from the 9th to the 6th centuries BCE.

According to the biblical narrative, David of the Tribe of Judah engaged in a protracted conflict with Ish-bosheth of the Tribe of Benjamin after the latter succeeded his father Saul to become the second king of an amalgamated Israel and Judah. Amidst this struggle, Yahweh had sent his prophet Samuel to anoint David as the true king of the Israelites. Following Ish-bosheth's assassination at the hands of his own army captains, David is traditionally believed to have acceded to the throne around 1010 BCE, replacing the House of Saul with his own and becoming the Israelite third king. He was succeeded by his son Solomon, whose mother was Bathsheba. Solomon's death led to the rejection of the House of David by most of the Twelve Tribes of Israel, with only Judah and Benjamin remaining loyal: the dissenters chose Jeroboam as their monarch and formed the Kingdom of Israel in the north (Samaria); while the loyalists kept Solomon's son Rehoboam as their monarch and formed the Kingdom of Judah in the south (Judea). With the success of Jeroboam's Revolt having severed Israel's connection to the House of David, only the Judahite monarchs, except Athaliah, were part of the Davidic line.

In the aftermath of the Babylonian siege of Jerusalem around 587 BCE, Solomon's Temple was destroyed and the Kingdom of Judah fell to the Neo-Babylonian Empire. Nearly 450 years later, the Hasmonean dynasty established the first independent Jewish kingdom since the Babylonian conquest, though it was not considered to be connected to the Davidic line nor to the Tribe of Judah.

In Jewish eschatology, the Messiah (מָשִׁיחַ) will be a Jewish king whose paternal bloodline traces to David. He is expected to rule over the Jewish people during the Messianic Age and in the world to come. Christianity believes the Davidic line continued to Jesus, hence the title Son of David, which plays a central role in Jesus’ claim to be the Christ or Messiah in that religion, but this is not accepted by Jews.

== Historicity ==
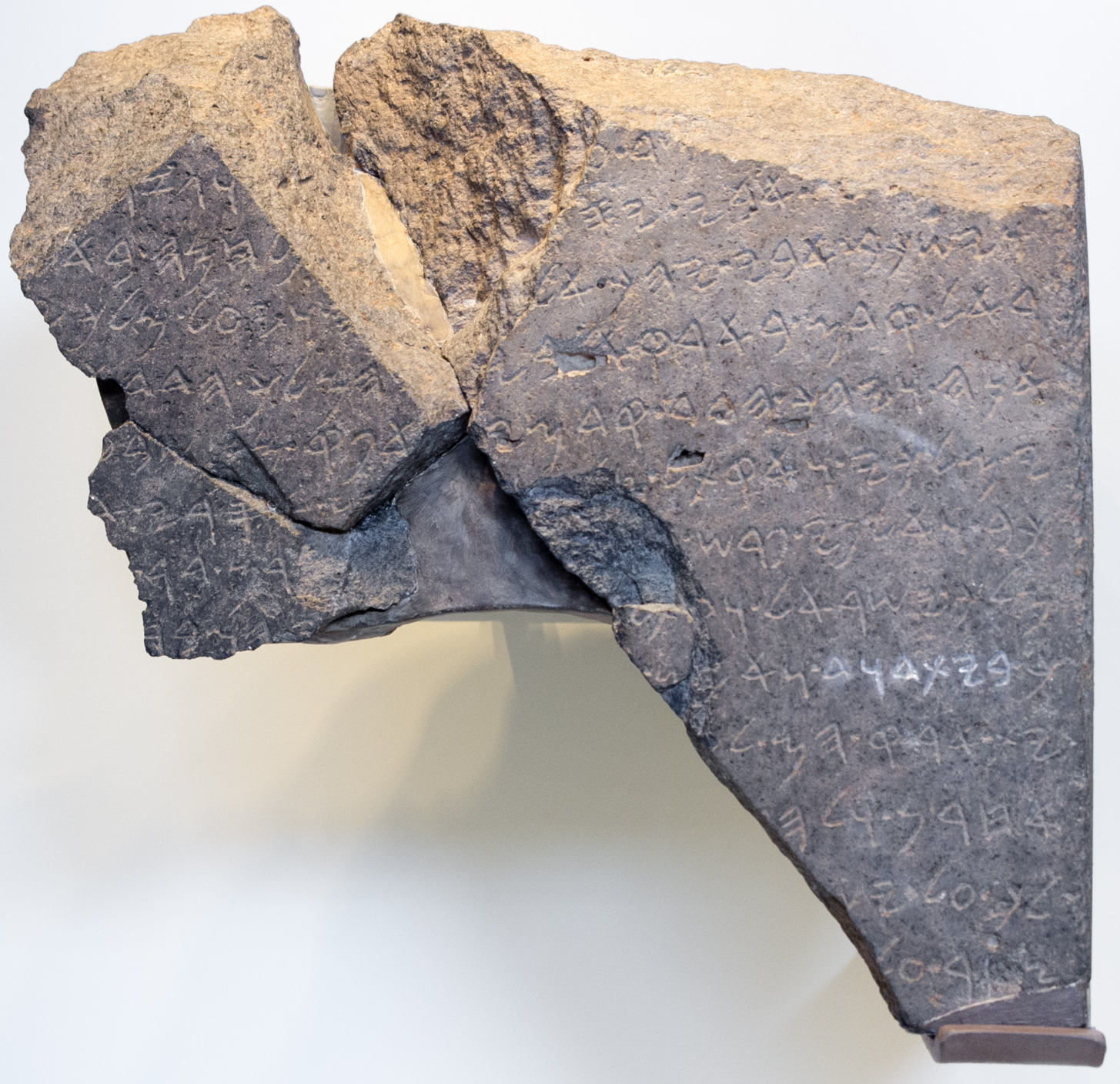
The Tel Dan Stele, with mention of the "House of David" highlighted in white.

Very little is conclusively known about the House of David. The Tel Dan Stele mentions the death of the reigning king from "BYTDWD", (interpreted as "House of David") and thus far is the only extrabiblical explicit mention of David himself. The stele is dated to circa 840 BCE; however, the name of the Davidic king is not totally preserved, as much of the stele has not survived since the 9th century BCE. All that remains of the name is the final syllable, the extremely common theophoric suffix -yahū. Because the stele coincides the death of the Davidic king with the death of [Jeho]ram, the king of the Kingdom of Samaria, scholars have reconstructed the second slain king as Ahaziah of Judah, the only king contemporary to Jehoram with a name ending in -yahū. (Note: Jehoram's reign in Israel saw three kings of Judah — Jehoshaphat, his son Jehoram of Judah, and his son, Ahaziah)

The earliest unambiguously (Note: 'Unambiguous' as Ahaziah's name on the Tel Dan Stele is incomplete, and there is no explicit confirmation that the apical ancestor David of Bayt-David was a king) attested king from the Davidic line is Uzziah, who reigned in the 8th century BCE, about 75 years after Ahaziah, who is named on bullae seals belonging to his servants Abijah and Shubnayahu. Uzziah may also be mentioned in the annals of Tiglath-Pileser III; however, the texts are largely fragmentary. (Note: The name in the annals is Azariah, not "Uzziah". While Uzziah is called "Azariah" several times in the Bible, scholars consider this to be the result of a later scribal error. Thus it is unlikely that Tiglath-Pileser's scribes would have used this name to refer to Uzziah.) Additionally, a tombstone dated to the Second Temple Period claiming to mark the grave (or, reburial) site of Uzziah, was discovered in a convent on the Mount of Olives in 1931, but there is no way of determining if the remains were genuinely Uzziah's as the stone had to have been carved more than 700 years after Uzziah died and was originally interred, and the tablet's provenance remains a mystery. A controversial artefact called the Jehoash Tablet recalls deeds performed by Jehoash of Judah, who reigned about 44 years before Uzziah; however, scholars are tensely divided on whether or not the inscription is genuine. After Uzziah, each successive king of Judah is attested to in some form, with the exception of Amon of Judah: Jotham, Uzziah's successor, is named on the seals of his own son and successor, Ahaz, who ruled from 732 to 716 BCE. Hezekiah, Ahaz's son, is attested to by numerous royal seals and Sennacherib's Annals; Manasseh is recorded giving tribute to Esarhaddon; Josiah has no relics explicitly naming him; however, seals belonging to his son Eliashib and officials Nathan-melech and Asaiah have been discovered; and the kings Jehoahaz II, Jehoiakim, and Zedekiah are never explicitly named in historical records but are instead alluded to; however, Jeconiah is mentioned by name in Babylonian documents detailing the rations he and his sons were given while held prisoner during the Babylonian captivity.

The origins of the dynasty, on the other hand, are shrouded in mystery. The Tel Dan Stele, as aforementioned, remains the only mention of David himself outside the Bible, and the historical reliability of the United Monarchy of Israel is archaeologically weak. The Stepped Stone Structure and Large Stone Structure in Jerusalem, assuming Eilat Mazar's contested stratigraphic dating of the structures to the Iron Age I is accurate, show that Jerusalem was at least somewhat populated in King David's time, and lends some credence to the biblical claim that Jerusalem was originally a Canaanite fortress; however, Jerusalem seems to have been barely developed until long after David's death, bringing into question the possibility that it could have been the imperial capital described in the Bible. In David's time, the capital probably served as little more than a formidable citadel, and the Davidic "kingdom" was most likely closer to a loosely-confederated regional polity, albeit a relatively substantial one. On the other hand, excavations at Khirbet Qeiyafa and Eglon, as well as structures from Hazor, Gezer, Megiddo and other sites conventionally dated to the 10th century BCE, are interpreted by many scholars to show that Judah was capable of accommodating large-scale urban societies centuries before minimalist scholars claim, and some have taken the physical archaeology of tenth-century Canaan as consistent with the former existence of a unified state on its territory, as archaeological findings demonstrate substantial development and growth at several sites, plausibly related to the tenth century. Even so, as for David and his immediate descendants themselves, the position of some scholars, as described by Israel Finkelstein and Neil Silberman, authors of The Bible Unearthed, espouses that David and Solomon may well be based on "certain historical kernels", and probably did exist in their own right, but their historical counterparts simply could not have ruled over a wealthy lavish empire as described in the Bible, and were more likely chieftains of a comparatively modest Israelite society in Judah and not regents over a kingdom proper.

== History ==
=== Kingdom of Israel and Judah ===
The genealogy of the kings of Judah, along with the kings of Israel.

According to the Tanakh, upon being chosen and becoming king, one was customarily anointed with holy oil poured on one's head. In David's case, this was done by the prophet Samuel.

Initially, David was king over the Tribe of Judah only and ruled from Hebron, but after seven and a half years, the other Israelite tribes, who found themselves leaderless after the death of Ish-bosheth, chose him to be their king as well.

All subsequent kings in both the ancient first united Kingdom of Israel and the later Kingdom of Judah claimed direct descent from King David to validate their claim to the throne in order to rule over the Israelite tribes.

==== Division after Solomon's death ====
After the death of David's son, King Solomon, the ten northern tribes of the Kingdom of Israel rejected the Davidic line, refusing to accept Solomon's son, Rehoboam, and instead chose as king Jeroboam and formed the northern Kingdom of Israel. This kingdom was conquered by the Neo-Assyrian Empire in the 8th century BCE which biblically and according to archaeology to date exiled much of the bulk population of the Northern Kingdom, thus ending its sovereign status. These are known to history as The Ten Lost Tribes. However, archaeology and documentation seems at this date to indicate that some of the population were left and intermixed with the Judean populations in the Kingdom of Judea, and two centuries later with the exiled Judean populations in Mesopotamia. The best archaeology and documentation to date also seem to indicate that the remaining non-exiled Israelite peoples in the Samaria highlands have become known as Samaritans during the classic era and to modern times. Some of this seems to be confirmed by DNA Analysis.

Family tree of the Davidic Dynasty to Exilarchs

Bathsheba	David; King of the United Monarchy: r. 1010–970 BCE	Maacah
Naamah	Solomon; King of the United Monarchy: r. 970–931 BCE	Absalom
Rehoboam; King of Judah: r. 931–913 BCE	Uriel
Maacah; Queen Mother of Judah: r. 910–895 BCE
?	Abijam; King of Judah: r. 913–910 BCE
Asa; King of Judah: r. 910–870 BCE	Azubah	Omri; King of Israel: r. 884–874 BCE
Jehoshaphat; King of Judah: r. 870–849 BCE	Jezebel	Ahab; King of Israel: r. 871–852 BCE
Jehoram; King of Judah: r. 849–842 BCE	Athaliah; Queen of Judah: r. 842–835 BCE	Joram; King of Israel: r. 849–837 BCE	Ahaziah; King of Israel: r. 850–849 BCE
Ahaziah; King of Judah: r. 842–841 BCE	Zibiah	Jehosheba	Jehoiada
Jehoash; King of Judah: r. 836–796 BCE	Jehoaddan
Amaziah; King of Judah: r. 796–767 BCE	Jecoliah	Amoz
Uzziah; King of Judah: r. 783–742 BCE	Jerusha	Isaiah
Jotham; King of Judah: r. 742–735 BCE	?	Hephzibah
Ahaz; King of Judah: r. 732–716 BCE	Abijah
Hezekiah; King of Judah: r. 716–687 BCE
Manasseh; King of Judah: r. 697–643 BCE	Meshullemeth
Amon; King of Judah: r. 643–610 BCE	Jedidah
Zebudah	Josiah; King of Judah: r. 640–609 BCE	Hamutal
Jehoiakim; King of Judah: r. 609–598 BCE	Nehushta	Jehoahaz; King of Judah: r. 609 BCE	Zedekiah; King of Judah: r. 596–586 BCE
Jehoiachin; King of Judah: r. 598–597 BCE
Shealtiel	Pedaiah
Zerubbabel; Governor of Yehud Medinata: fl. 538–520 BCE
Exilarchs

=== The Exilarchate ===
Later rabbinical authorities granted the office of exilarch to family members that traced its patrilineal descent from David, King of Israel. The highest official of Babylonian Jewry was the exilarch (Reish Galuta, "Head of the Diaspora"). Those who held the position traced their ancestry to the House of David in the male line. The position holder was regarded as a king-in-waiting, residing in Babylonia in the Achaemenid Empire as well as during the classic era. The Seder Olam Zutta attributes the office to Zerubbabel, a member of the Davidic line, who is mentioned as one of the leaders of the Jewish community in the 6th century BC, holding the title of Achaemenid Governor of Yehud Medinata.

=== Hasmonean and Herodian periods ===
The Hasmoneans, also known as the Maccabees, established their own monarchy in Judea following their revolt against the Hellenistic Seleucid dynasty. The Hasmoneans were not considered connected to the Davidic line nor to the Tribe of Judah. The Levites had always been excluded from the Israelite monarchy, so when the Maccabees assumed the throne in order to rededicate the defiled Second Temple, a cardinal rule was broken. According to scholars within Orthodox Judaism, this is considered to have contributed to their downfall and the eventual downfall of Judea; internal strife allowing for Roman occupation and the violent installation of Herod the Great as client king over the Roman province of Judea; and the subsequent destruction of the Second Temple by the future Emperor Titus.

During the Hasmonean period, the Davidic line was largely excluded from the royal house in Judea, but some members had risen to prominence as religious and communal leaders. One of the most notable of those was Hillel the Elder, who moved to Judea from his birthplace in Babylon. His great-grandson Simeon ben Gamliel became one of the Jewish leaders during the First Jewish–Roman War.

=== Middle Ages ===
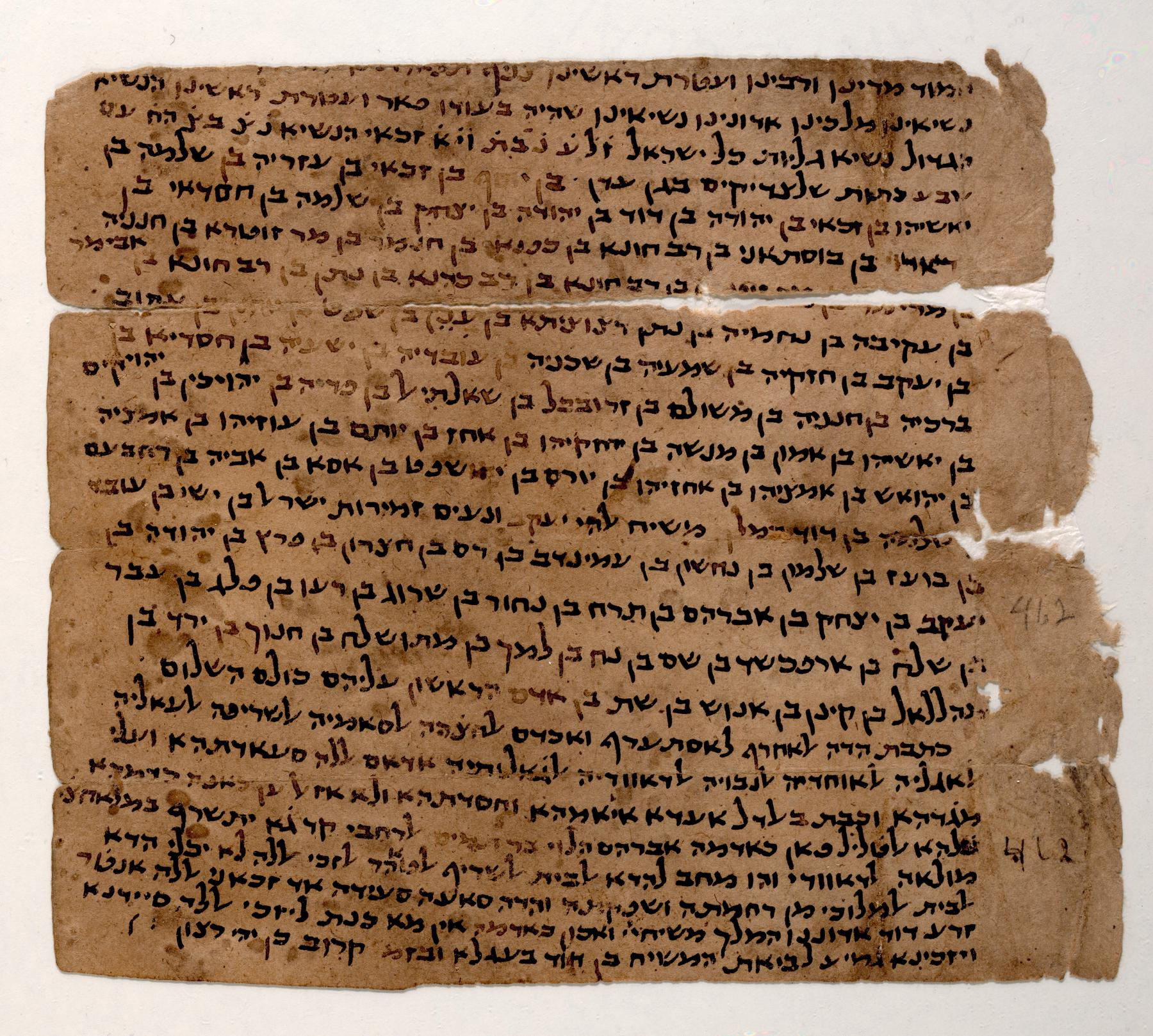
Genealogy of the Exilarchs to David and Adam, Avraham ben Tamim, Cairo Geniza, 1100s (Katz Center/UPenn)

The Exilarchate in the Sasanian Empire was briefly abolished as a result of a revolt by the Mar-Zutra II in the late 5th century CE, with his son Mar-Zutra III being denied the office and relocating to Tiberias, then within the Byzantine Empire. Mar Ahunai lived in the period succeeding Mar Zutra II, but for almost fifty years after the failed revolt he did not dare to appear in public, and it is not known whether even then (c. 550) he really acted as Exilarch. The names of Kafnai and his son Haninai, who were Exilarchs in the second half of the 6th century, have been preserved.

The Exilarchate in Mesopotamia was officially restored after the Arab conquest in the 7th century and continued to function during the early Caliphates. Exilarchs continued to be appointed until the 11th century, with some members of the Davidic line dispersing across the Islamic world. There are conflicting accounts of the fate of the Exilarch family in the 11th century; according to one version Hezekiah ben David, who was the last Exilarch and also the last Gaon, was imprisoned and tortured to death. Two of his sons fled to Al-Andalus, where they found refuge with Joseph, the son and successor of Samuel ibn Naghrillah. However, The Jewish Quarterly Review mentions that Hezekiah was liberated from prison, and became head of the academy, and is mentioned as such by a contemporary in 1046. An unsuccessful attempt of David ben Daniel of the Davidic line to establish an Exilarchate in the Fatimid Caliphate failed and ended with his downfall in 1094.

In the 11th–15th century, families that descended from the Exilarchs that lived in the South of France (Narbonne and Provence) and in northern Iberian peninsula (Barcelona, Aragon and Castile) received the title "Nasi" in the communities and were called "free men". They had a special economic and social status in the Jewish community, and they were close to their respective governments, some serving as advisers and tax collectors/finance ministers.

These families had special rights in Narbonne, Barcelona, and Castile. They possessed real estate and received the title "Don" and de la Kblriih (De la Cavalleria). Among the families of the "Sons of the Free" are the families of Abravanel and Benveniste.

In his book, A Jewish Princedom in Feudal France, Arthur J. Zuckerman proposes a theory that from 768 to 900 CE a Jewish Princedom ruled by members of the Exilarchs existed in feudal France. However, this theory has been widely contested. Descendants of the house of exilarchs were living in various places long after the office became extinct. The grandson of Hezekiah ben David through his eldest son David ben Chyzkia, Hiyya al-Daudi, died in 1154 in Castile according to Abraham ibn Daud and is the ancestor of the ibn Yahya family. Several families, as late as the 14th century, traced their descent back to Josiah, the brother of David ben Zakkai who had been banished to Chorasan (see the genealogies in [Lazarus 1890] pp. 180 et seq.). The descendants of the Karaite Exilarchs have been referred to above.

A number of Jewish families in the Iberian peninsula and within Mesopotamia continued to preserve the tradition of descent from Exilarchs in the Late Middle Ages, including the families of Abravanel, ibn Yahya and Ben-David. The patriarch of the Coronel Family, Abraham Senior, is referred to in a letter of 1487 from the Jews of Castile to the Jews of Rome and Lombardy as 'the Exilarch who is over us'. Several Ashkenazi scholars also claimed descent from King David. On his father's side, Rashi has been claimed to be a 33rd-generation descendant of Johanan HaSandlar, who was a fourth-generation descendant of Gamaliel, who was reputedly descended from the Davidic line. Similarly Maimonides claimed 37 generations between him and Simeon ben Judah ha-Nasi, who was also a fourth-generation descendant of Gamaliel. Meir Perels traced the ancestry of Judah Loew ben Bezalel to the Hai Gaon through Judah Loew's alleged great-great-grandfather Judah Leib the Elder and therefore also from the Davidic dynasty; however, this claim is widely disputed, by many scholars such as Otto Muneles. Hai Gaon was the son of Sherira Gaon, who claimed descent from Rabbah b. Abuha, who belonged to the family of the exilarch, thereby claiming descent from the Davidic line. Sherira's son-in-law was Elijah ben Menahem HaZaken. The patriarch of the Meisels family, Yitskhak Eizik Meisels, was an alleged 10th generation descendant of the Exilarch, Mar Ukba. The Berduga family of Meknes claim paternal descent from the Exilarch, Bostanai. The Jewish banking family Louis Cahen d'Anvers claimed descent from the Davidic Line Rabbi Yosef Dayan, who is a modern-day claimant to the Davidic throne in Israel and the founder of the Monarchist party Malchut Israel, descends from the Dayan family of Aleppo, who paternally descend from Hasan ben Zakkai, the younger brother of the Exilarch David I (d. 940). One of Hasan's descendants Solomon ben Azariah ha-Nasi settled in Aleppo were the family became Dayans (judges) of the city and thus adopted the surname Dayan. The Ruzhin (Hasidic dynasty) line is traced to King David by way of Rabbi Yohanan, the sandal-maker and master in the Talmud. Rabbi Menachem Mendel Schneerson, the Lubavitcher Rebbe, could trace his lineage back to Rabbi Shnuer Zalman of Liadi, the founder of the Chabad Hasidic movement, and ultimately to King David.

== In Judaism ==
=== Eschatology ===
In Jewish eschatology, the term mashiach, or "Messiah", came to refer to a future Jewish king from the Davidic line, who is expected to be anointed with holy anointing oil and rule the Jewish people during the Messianic Age. The Messiah is often referred to as "King Messiah", or, in Hebrew, מלך משיח (melekh mashiach), and, in Aramaic, malka meshiḥa.

Orthodox views have generally held that the Messiah will be a patrilineal descendant of King David, and will gather the Jews back into the Land of Israel, usher in an era of peace, build the Third Temple, father a male heir, re-institute the Sanhedrin, and so on. Jewish tradition alludes to two redeemers, both of whom are called mashiach and are involved in ushering in the Messianic age: Mashiach ben David; and Mashiach ben Yosef. In general, the term Messiah unqualified refers to Mashiach ben David (Messiah, son of David).

=== Modern legacy ===
In 2012, The Jerusalem Post reported that philanthropist Susan Roth created Davidic Dynasty as subsidiary of her Eshet Chayil Foundation, dedicated to finding, databasing, and connecting Davidic descendants and running the King David Legacy Center in Jerusalem. In 2020, Roth chose Brando Crawford, a descendant from both grandfathers, to represent the organization internationally. The King David Legacy Center has seen support from Haredi Jews in Jerusalem.

== In other Abrahamic religions ==
=== Christianity ===
In the Christian interpretation the "Davidic covenant" of a Davidic line in 2 Samuel 7 is understood in various ways, traditionally referring to the genealogies of Jesus in the New Testament. One Christian interpretation of the Davidic line counts the line as continuing to Jesus son of Joseph, according to the genealogies which are written in Matthew 1:1-16 descendants of Solomon and Luke 3:23-38 descendants of Nathan son of David through the line of Mary.

Because Jews have historically believed that the Messiah will be a male-line descendant of David, the lineage of Jesus is sometimes cited as a reason why Jews do not believe that he was the Messiah. As the proposed son of God, he could not have been a male descendant of David because according to the genealogy of his earthly parents, Mary and Joseph, he did not have the proper lineage, because he would not have been a male descendant of Mary, and Joseph, who was a descendant of Jeconiah, because Jeconiah's descendants are explicitly barred from ever ruling Israel by God.

Another Christian interpretation emphasizes the minor, non-royal, line of David through Solomon's brother Nathan as it is recorded in the Gospel of Luke chapter 3 (entirely undocumented in the Hebrew Bible), which is often understood to be the family tree of Mary's father. A widely spread traditional Christian interpretation relates the non-continuation of the main Davidic line from Solomon to the godlessness of the line of Jehoiachin which started in the early 500s BC, when Jeremiah cursed the main branch of the Solomonic line, by saying that no descendant of "[Je]Coniah" would ever reign on the throne of Israel again (Jeremiah 22:30). Some Christian commentators also believe that this same "curse" is the reason why Zerubbabel, the rightful Solomonic king during the time of Nehemiah, was not given a kingship under the Persian empire.

The Tree of Jesse (a reference to David's father) is a traditional Christian artistic representation of Jesus' genealogical connection to David.

=== Islam ===
The Quran mentions the House of David once: "Work, O family of David, in gratitude. And few of My servants are grateful." and mentions David himself sixteen times.

According to some Islamic sources, some of the Jewish settlers in Arabia were of the Davidic line, Mohammad-Baqer Majlesi recorded: "A Jewish man from the Davidic line entered Medina and found the people in deep sorrow. He enquired the people, 'What is wrong?' Some of the people replied: Prophet Muhammad passed away".

== See also ==
- History of ancient Israel and Judah
  - Kings of Israel and Judah
  - Kings of Judah
    - LMLK seal
- Abravanel family, a Sephardic Jewish family claiming descent from David
- Bagrationi dynasty, a Georgian dynasty claiming descent from David
  - Claim of the biblical descent of the Bagrationi dynasty
- Solomonic dynasty, an Ethiopian dynasty claiming descent from David's son Solomon
  - Kebra Nagast
- Tree of Jesse, a Christian artistic depiction of Jesus' family tree beginning with David's father Jesse
