= David ben Boaz =

David ben Boaz (Hebrew: דוד בן בעז, Arabic: Abu Sa'id Dawud ibn Bu'az) was a Karaite Jewish scholar who flourished in the tenth century CE. He is reported to have been the fifth in the line of descent from Anan ben David, the founder of Karaism (he was the son of Boaz ben Jehoshaphat, the son of Jehoshaphat ben Saul, the son of Saul ben Anan, the son of Anan ben David.) He was thus considered resh galuta or exilarch of the Karaite community within the Abbasid Caliphate, in opposition to the rabbinical claimant

The Karaite chronicler al-Hiti mentions David under the year 383 of the Hijrah (993 CE.), and gives the titles of the following three works written by him: a commentary on Ecclesiastes; a commentary on the Pentateuch; a treatise on the fundamental principles of the Pentateuch. Of these three only a fragment of the second, comprising Leviticus and the latter half of Deuteronomy, is still extant in manuscript in the St. Petersburg Library. In this commentary, says Harkavy, David frequently attacks Saadia Gaon, whom he never calls by name, but by the appellation "hadha al-rajul" (this man).

David was succeeded as resh galuta of the Karaites by his son Solomon ben David.
