= Ukba =

Ukba may refer to:

- Mar Ukba ben Judah, an exilarch at Baghdad in the first half of the tenth century
- Mar Ukba, a Babylonian amora
- Ukban ben Nehemiah, a Babylonian amora

UKBA stands for

- UK Border Agency, former agency responsible for securing the United Kingdom's borders and controlling migration
