= Yahia =

Yahia (Arabic: يحيى, romanized: Yaḥyā) is a masculine given name of Arabic origin. Notable people with the name include:

== Given name ==
- Yahia Ben Bakr, Mozarab figure in Portugal
- Yahia Belaskri (born 1952), Algerian novelist
- Yahia Benmabrouk (1928–2004), Algerian comedian and film actor
- Yahia Boukhari (born 1953), Algerian politician
- Yahia Boushaki (Shahid) (1935–1960), Algerian politician and revolutionary
- Yehia El-Fakharany (born 1945), Egyptian TV and movie actor
- Yahia Fofana (born 2000), Ivorian footballer
- Yahia Gregni (born 1970), Libyan judoka
- Yahia Guidoum (1940/41–2020), Algerian surgeon and politician
- Yahia al-Houthi (born 1965), Yemeni political leader
- Yahia Kaidum, Algerian politician
- Yahia Kébé (born 1985), Burkinabé footballer
- Yahia Abdel Mageed (1925–2020), Sudanese scientist
- Yahia El-Mekachari (born 1990), Tunisian boxer
- Yahia Mufarrih (born 1968), Yemeni judoka
- Yahia Nader (born 1998), Emirati footballer
- Yahia Nasseri, Iraqi politician
- Yahia Omar (born 1997), Egyptian handball player
- Yahia Ouahabi (born 1940), Algerian footballer
- Yahia Ben Rabbi (1150–1222), Portuguese nobleman
- Yahia Rashwan (born 1969), Egyptian taekwondo practitioner
- Yahia Shakmak (born 1985), Libyan basketball player
- Yahia Al-Shehri (born 1985), Saudi footballer
- Yahia Turki (1903–1969), Tunisian painter
- Yahia Ben Yahi III, Portuguese rabbi
- Yahia Zagury (1878–1959), Moroccan Jewish leader

== Surname ==
- Alaeddine Yahia (born 1981), French-Tunisian footballer
- Antar Yahia (born 1982), Algerian footballer
- Karim Naït Yahia (born 1980), Algerian footballer
- Latif Yahia (born 1964), Iraqi author and alleged body double of Uday Hussein
- Rafik Haj Yahia (1949–2000), Israeli-Arab politician

== See also ==
- Yihyah
- Yahya (name)
