= Amemar =

Babylonian rabbi of the fifth and sixth generation of amoraim

- אַמֵּימָר
- Title: Rabbi, Amora

Personal life
- Flourished: 5th-6th century
- Children: Mar
- Known for: Reestablishing the Nehardea Academy

Religious life
- Religion: Judaism
- Institute: Nehardea Academy

Senior posting
- Teacher: Rava, Rav Yosef bar Hiyya, Rav Nachman
- Students: Rav Ashi, Huna bar Nathan

Amemar (Hebrew: אַמֵּימָר, romanized: ʾammēmār) was a Babylonian rabbi of the fifth and sixth generation of amoraim. His name is a compound word formed from the personal name Ammi and the title Mar "master".

== Biography ==
Amemar was one of the leading sages of his generation. He reestablished the Nehardea Academy, and restored it to its original reputable position—it having been destroyed over a century before by Odaenathus—and was its rector for more than thirty years (390-422). In addition to that office, he was the president of the court at Nehardea and introduced several ritual changes. Later he moved to Māḥozē, where he also served as a religious judge.

His teachers include Rava, Rav Yosef bar Hiyya, and Rav Nachman. Later on he learned from students of Rava and Abaye, including Rav Zevid and Rav Pappa.

His students include the leading amoraim of the sixth generation, including Rav Ashi (who became Amemar's "Fellow Student") and Huna bar Nathan, the Exilarch.

The Talmud frequently records him together with his colleagues, Mar Zutra and Rav Ashi. On royal festivals, the three of them officially represented the Jews at the court of Yazdegerd I. On one of these occasions, Huna bar Nathan was among the assembled dignitaries, and the king, happening to notice that Huna's girdle was disheveled, adjusted it, remarking, "It is written of you, 'You shall be a kingdom of priests and a holy nation,' and you must therefore wear the girdle as priests do." When Amemar heard of this, he said to Huna, "On you has been realized the prophetic promise, 'Kings shall be your attendants'".

His mother's father was Rami bar Hama. Amemar's erudition was continued in his son Mar, who often quoted him to Rav Ashi. A grandson of Amemar's died in his lifetime, and he tore his clothes when he found out. When Amemar's son, the bereaved father, arrived, Amemar tore again. He had torn while sitting, but when he remembered that halacha requires tearing to be done while standing, he stood up and tore a third time. In later generations, some of his descendants served as geonim in the yeshivas of Sura and Pumbedita.

According to the Talmud, he died after Rav Ashi and Amemar's son discussed Amemar's death in an innocent halachic context.

== Teachings ==
Many halachic discussions between him and Rav Ashi are recorded.

Some of his homiletic observations appear in the Babylonian Talmud.

=== Quotes ===
- A wise man is preferable to a prophet.
