= Ben Yahia =

Ben Yahia or Benyahia is a name. People with the name include:

== Historic ==
- Bakr Ben Yahia (born 9th century), an important Mozarab figure in Medieval Portugal
- Yahia Ben Rabbi (c. 1150–1222), also known as Yahya Ha-Nasi, Yahya Ibn Yaish, Dom Yahia "o Negro", direct descendant of the Exilarchs of Babylon, the eponymous ancestor of the Ibn Yahya family
- Yahia Ben Yahi III, also known as Jahia Negro Ibn Ya'isch, a Sephardi Jew also known as Yahya Ha-Nasi, Yahya Ibn Yaish or Dom Yahia "o Negro", the son of Yahia Ben Rabbi

== Contemporary ==
- Amor Ben Yahia (born 1985), Tunisian runner
- Habib Ben Yahia (born 1938), Tunisian politician
- Mohammed Seddik Benyahia (1932–1982), Algerian politician and a militant nationalist during the war in Algeria
- Wissem Ben Yahia (born 1984), Tunisian footballer
- Inès Benyahia (born 2003), French footballer
