= Abraham al-Harselani =

Abraham al-Harselani was a Karaite scholar active in Babylonia during the 10th century.

Al-Harselani is mentioned in the chronicle of Al-Hiti, where he is noted for his disputes with rabbinic scholars. He is also cited as an authoritative Karaite figure by Mordecai ben Nissim in Dod Mordekhai. No writings by al-Harselani have survived.
