= Solomon (Karaite prince) =

Solomon ben David (Hebrew: שלמה בן דוד) was a Karaite leader of the late tenth and early eleventh centuries CE. He was the son of David ben Boaz. As a direct lineal descendant of Anan ben David, he was regarded as nasi and resh galuta of the Karaite community. He was succeeded by his son Hezekiah ben Solomon.
