= Semah ben Josiah =

Karaite rabbi

- צמח בן יאשיהו
- Title: Nasi and Rosh Yeshiva

Personal life
- Flourished: 9th century
- Parent: Josiah ben Saul (father)

Religious life
- Religion: Judaism

Jewish leader
- Based in: Land of Israel
- Post: Gaon of Palestine
- Period in office: c. 862–893
- Predecessor: Jehoshaphat ben Josiah (possibly)
- Successor: Aaron ben Moses ben Meir

Semah ben Josiah (Hebrew: צמח בן יאשיהו) was the great-grandson of Anan ben David, a Nasi, and the head of the Palestinian yeshiva in the 9th century.

== Details ==
According to a fragment found in the Cairo Genizah (T-S 312.82), Semah reigned as head of the Palestinian Yeshiva for 31 years and was a Rabbanite. His children lost the position to the rival Gaonic family. Another Genizah fragment (T-S 12.128) lists Semah as both a Rosh Yeshiva and a Nasi.

Semah was preceded in the Gaonate by his brother Jehoshaphat.
