= Huna bar Nathan =

Babylonian rabbi and exilarch

Rav Huna bar Natan (Jewish Babylonian Aramaic: הונא בר נתן, read as Rav Huna bereih deRav Natan (רב הונא בריה דרב נתן)) was a Babylonian rabbi and exilarch, of the fifth and sixth generations of amoraim.

== Biography ==
Huna's father was also a known scholar, mentioned occasionally in the Talmud as "Rav Natan father of Rav Huna".

In Huna's youth he was able to learn with Rava. His main rabbis were Rav Papa and Amemar, and once Rav Papa visited him in his house. Amemar permitted him to marry a woman from Mahoza, even though the lineage of people from there was not clearly known.

Huna served as an Exilarch, or political leader, to the Jewish community in Babylonia. His term overlapping with Rav Ashi's term as Dean of the academy of Sura. He had access to the Sassanid Empire, and especially to the king Yazdegerd I, who ruled over Babylonia at the time, and was known for his kindness towards the Jewish community there. Huna was one of the close associates of Yazdegerd I (called אזגור מלכא or איזגדר מלכא in the Talmud). Huna—together with his colleagues Rav Ashi, Amemar, and Mar Zutra—would often go to visit the royal court.

However, while Huna was the official political leader of the Jews, Rav Ashi was recognized as the greater halachic authority, and even Huna was regarded as "subject to" Rav Ashi.

Regnal titles
Preceded by Nathan Ukban III	11th Babylonian Exilarch; 400?	Succeeded by Abba
