= Solomon ben Hasdai =

Solomon ben Hasdai was the son of Hasdai ben Hezekiah. He was the tenth Karaite exilarch of the house of Anan ben David, and the last of Anan's descendants to be regarded by the Karaites as their nasi. During his reign, many Karaite communities were destroyed by the Seljuks and Karaism as a rival to rabbinical Judaism declined sharply.
