= Hezekiah ben Solomon =

Karaite rabbi

Hezekiah ben Solomon (Hebrew: חזקיה בן שלמה) was the son of Solomon ben David and thus was the eighth Karaite exilarch of the line of Anan ben David. He lived in Iraq during the eleventh century. He was the father of Hasdai ben Hezekiah.

He is a signatory to an agreement preserved in the Cairo Geniza.
