= Nathan ben Isaac HaBabli =

Babylonian Jewish historian (f. 10th century)

Nathan ben Isaac ha-Kohen ha-Babli was a Babylonian Jewish historian of the 10th century. He was the author of a history of the exilarchate, Aḫbār Baġdād, that chronicles the life of Mar Ukba. Extracts from this history were published by Samuel Shullam in his edition of Zacuto's Yuḥasin (Constantinople, 1546), as well as by A. Neubauer (M. J. C. ii. 83 et seq.). Shullam's work is the only surviving source for Nathan's history other than an Arabic fragment published by Israel Friedlander.

Since Nathan ben Jehiel of Rome, the author of the Arukh, is quoted in Zacuto's Yuḥasin (ed. Filipowski, p. 174, London, 1856) as "Nathan ha-Babli of Narbonne," H. Grätz (Gesch. 3d ed., v. 288, 469–471) mistook the latter for Nathan ben Isaac ha-Kohen ha-Babli and ascribed to him an Arukh similar to that written by Nathan b. Jehiel. Grätz even went so far as to identify Nathan ben Isaac with the fourth of the four prisoners captured by Ibn Rumaḥis (see Ḥushiel ben Elhanan), assuming that he settled afterward at Narbonne.

== Jewish Encyclopedia bibliography ==
- A. Geiger, in Hebr. Bibl. iii.4;
- Henri Gross, Gallia Judaica, p. 409.
