= Paltoi ben Abaye =

Babylonian rabbi (d. 858)

Palletay Ishoʽya bar Abaye (Jewish Babylonian Aramaic: פלטוי ישעיה בר אביי:, romanized: Pullāṭāy Yšuʿyā bar Aḇāyā, c. 820 – 858) was the gaon of Pumbedita Academy in Lower Mesopotamia from 841 up until he died in 858. His tenure as gaon was idealistic and innovative, heralding a new era of prominence for the Gaonate of Pumbedita.

== Biography ==
Born about 820, his father, Abaya bar Natronai, was the paternal grandson of the Exilarch Mar-Zutra III. Despite that, his family was seen as poor. He was the youngest-ever Gaon, appointed at 21. During his time as gaon, his halakhic authority and influence stretched beyond just Babylon, reaching communities in Spain and North Africa. At one point, a community in al-Andalus sent a letter to Paltay requesting that he "write the Talmud and its explanations for them" on the basis that no one in their community would be knowledgeable enough to do so. Paltay vigorously protested against this, stating, "They are not acting correctly, and it is forbidden to do this. They thereby cause a decline in the study of the Torah, causing it to be forgotten." This exemplifies the idealistic attitude that defined him and the future of the Pumbedita Academy. His responsa can be found in most collections of Geonic responsa and is quoted in the works of the posekim. Although this represents a minority of those he wrote. Although young, Paltay could be incredibly strict at times, excommunicating communities for disobedience of Halakha. Paltay died in 858, and was succeeded by Aha Kahana ben Mar Rav. Paltay's son Zemah ben Paltoi was Pumbedita Gaon from 872-90.

| Preceded by Joseph ben R. Abba | Gaon of the Pumbedita Academy; 841-858 | Succeeded by Aha Kahana ben Mar Rav |
