= Boaz ben Jehoshaphat =

Boaz ben Jehoshaphat (Hebrew: בעז בן יהושפט) was the son of Jehoshaphat ben Josiah and the great-great-grandson of Anan ben David. He lived in Iraq during the mid ninth century. As the direct lineal heir of Anan, Boaz was nasi and resh galuta of the Karaite Jews. He was the father of David ben Boaz.
