= Anan (name) =

Anan is both a given name and a surname.

== Hebrew/Arabic ==
Anan (Hebrew: עָנַן ‘ānan) is used as both a Hebrew or Arabic name meaning "cloud, vapour" or descriptive "visible water vapour floating above the earth". The Arabic form is from Classical Arabic, possibly adopted from the Hebrew. Notable people with the Hebrew name include:

- Anan, one of the Israelites who sealed the covenant after the return from Babylon (Nehemiah 10:27)
- Anan (amora), Babylonian Jewish scholar
- Anan ben David, Karaite
- Saul ben Anan, Karaite Jewish leader of the eighth century CE

=== Notable people with Arabic name ===
Notable people with the Arabic name include:

- Anan Anwar, Thai singer and actor
- Sami Hafez Anan, Chief of Staff of the Egyptian Armed Forces

=== Other notable people ===
Other notable people who are not related to the Hebrew-Arabic meaning of name but carries the name or surname:

- Anan Sugiyama (杉山歩南), Japanese idol
- Chế A Nan, a Vietnamese king from the region of Champa
- Junro Anan (阿南準郎), Japanese baseball player
- Kenji Anan (阿南健治), Japanese actor
- Pokklaw Anan, Thai footballer

== Hindi ==
In Hindi, the name "Anan" means face. Rarely is a person named Anan in India. However, when Anan is conjoined with some number, it denotes either a God or a demon. Examples:

- Chaturanan [one with four faces] - Lord Brahma
- Panchanana [one with five faces] - Lord Shiva
- Dashanana [one with ten faces] - Demon Ravana
