= Samuel Shullam =

Jewish physician and historian

Samuel Shullam was a Jewish physician and historian who flourished in the second half of the 16th century. He was of Sephardic descent, and after an adventurous life went to Constantinople, where he was supported by Kiera (Esther), who stood high in favor at the court of the sultan. At her expense he published, but with many omissions, Abraham Zacuto's Yuḥasin (Constantinople, 1566), to which he added the Arabic chronology of the dynasties by the Syriac historian Gregory Bar-Hebraeus, supplemented by a Turkish history, his own work. He published also:

- a Hebrew translation of Josephus' Contra Apionem
- the Letter of Sherira Gaon
- the account of Nathan the Babylonian of the last geonim

Shullam omitted Zacuto's report upon the expulsion of the Jews from Spain, because he himself intended to write a full history of the persecutions, a task that was accomplished by his contemporary Joseph ha-Kohen in his Emeḳ ha-Baka.

== Jewish Encyclopedia bibliography ==
- Grätz, Gesch. 2d ed., ix. 403-404;
- Weiss, Dor, v. 93–94.
