= Ukban ben Nehmiah =

Late 3rd century Babylonian Jewish Amora sage

Ukban ben Nehmiah was a Jewish Amora sage of the third generation, who, according to Joseph ben Ḥama, who was a contrite sinner. The Seder 'Olam Zuṭa, too, in the list of the exilarchs, mentions an exilarch called "Ukban d'Zuzita" who was buried in Israel. According to the geonim Ẓemaḥ and Saadia, Ukban, when he was young, was wont to curl his hair, his surname "de-Ẓuẓita" being derived from that habit. Another interpretation is that fire would flash out from his ẓiẓit, so that nobody could stand near him.

As to the nature of Ukban's sins and repentance Rabbi Aḥai of Shabḥa, in his "She'eltot" (sections "Wa'era" and "Ki Tissa"), tells almost the same story as Rashi, of a man who was called "Nathan de-Ẓuẓita," but without mentioning either that he was likewise called "'Ukban" or that he was an exilarch. Further, this story is related by Nissim ben Jacob in his "Ma'aseh Nissim," at great length, Nathan being placed in the time of Akiba—that is, not later than the first third of the second century.

It may therefore be assumed either that there were two Nathan de-Ẓuẓitas, the second being identical with the exilarch Ukban b. Nehemiah, or that Joseph b. Ḥama must be understood as comparing Ukban, in his repentance, to Nathan de-Ẓuẓita, who was much earlier and, perhaps, was not an exilarch. It is true that in the Seder 'Olam Zuṭa it is clearly affirmed that Nathan I was called also "Ukban"; but in other details the three recensions of that work disagree with Joseph ben Hama, in that they leave it to be supposed that Nathan de-Ẓuẓita was the son of Anan and not of Nehemiah, and that they represent him as the father of Huna the exilarch, who lived in the time of Judah ha-Nasi I. The Seder 'Olam Zuṭa has in its list three exilarchs called "Nathan," the second being the grandson of the first, and the third the son of Abba ben Huna and father of Mar Zuṭra; it is the chronology of Nathan III that coincides with that of another Ukban.

It may be added that Rashi (to Sanh. l.c.) confuses Nathan de-Ẓuẓita 'Ukban with Mar Ukba, "ab bet din" in the time of Samuel, which time coincides with that of Nathan II. Lazarus (in the list of exilarchs in Brüll's "Jahrb." vol. x.) supposes that Nathan I reigned from about 260 to about 270, and Nathan II from 370 to about 400.

== See also ==
- Exilarch

Regnal titles
Preceded by Nehemiah	10th Babylonian Exilarch; 400?	Succeeded by Huna III
