= Mar-Zutra II =

Jewish Exilarch who led a revolt against the Sassanid Empire

Mar Zutra מר זוטרא
- Resh Galutha

Exilarch in the Sasanian Empire
- Reign: 483 – 520
- Predecessor: Mar Huna VI
- Successor: Mar Ahunai
- Born: c. 468 CE; Ctesiphon, Sasanian Empire
- Died: c. 520 CE; Ctesiphon, Sasanian Empire
- Issue: Mar Ahunai; Mar-Zutra
- Dynasty: Davidic dynasty
- Father: Haninai
- Mother: Havah bat Huna
- Religion: Judaism

Mar-Zutra II (Jewish Babylonian Aramaic: מר זוטרא, ריש גלותא, romanized: Mar Zutra, Resh Galutha) was a Jewish Exilarch who led a revolt against the Sasanian rulers in 495 CE and achieved seven years of political independence in Mahoza.

Mar-Zutra II became Exilarch of the Jewish community in Babylon at the age of fifteen in 483 CE, twelve years before the revolt. After King Kavadh I had denied Jews the right to organize their own militia, Mar-Zutra took advantage of the confusion into which Mazdak's communistic attempts had plunged Persia and led a successful military revolt that achieved political independence for the Jews of Mahoza.

The Jewish state lasted seven years, until 502 CE. Mar-Zutra II remained exarch until 520. He had a son named Mar-Zutra III. The latter did not attain to the office of Exilarch, but returned to the Land of Israel, where he became head of the Academy of Tiberias, under the title of "Resh Pirka" ('Aρχιφεκίτησ), several generations of his descendants succeeding him in this office.

Mar Zutra's successor, Mar Ahunai, did not dare to appear in public for almost thirty years following this episode and it is not known whether he ever truly assumed the full powers of Exilarch during Kavadh's reign, which ended in 531 CE.
