= Hasdai I =

Jewish Exilarch

Hasdai, or Hisday, a derivative of 'Hasadiah' (Hebrew: חֲסַדְיָה), was a Jewish Exilarch of the late 7th century AD, succeeding his father Bostanai to the office. Some sources allege he left no male heirs, and the succession went with the descendants of his brother, Baradoi. Alternatively, the exilarch Solomon I is said to be his son and eventually heir. Little to nothing is known about his tenure as exilarch beyond the legal dispute that he had with his Persian half-siblings and their mother.

== See also ==
- Exilarch
- Seder Olam Zutta

Regnal titles
Preceded by Bostanai	29th Babylonian Exilarch abt. 670	Succeeded by Baradoi
