= Huna Kamma =

2nd century Jewish Rabbi and Tanna sage

Rav Huna Kamma (Aramaic/Hebrew: הונא קמא, lit. Huna I) was a rabbi of the 2nd century CE (fifth generation of tannaim) and Babylonian Exilarch, allegedly descending from King David. The Seder Olam Zutta refers to him as "Anani", both names being a derivative of "Hananiah". The exact time of his tenure as exilarch is unknown, but it was estimated to have been between 170 and 210 AD.

== Identification ==
The Talmud refers to him merely as R. Huna, which caused confusion between him and Rav Huna. Thus R. Sherira Gaon referred to him as Huna Kamma (Kamma in Aramaic = the first). Later rabbis continued this usage. Similarly, Samuel of Nehardea asked questions of a "Rav Huna"; it is unlikely that this was Rav Huna, who was much younger than Samuel. Tosafot concluded that this was a different rabbi from Rav Huna. Some believe this other rabbi was in fact Rav Huna Kamma.

== Biography ==
He was the highest Jewish leader (exilarch) in Babylonia, at the same time Judah haNasi was the highest leader (nasi) in the Land of Israel. Once Judah haNasi asked R. Hiyya whether he could be obligated (if the Temple had been standing) to offer the "Korban Nasi" (leader's sacrifice) over sins he might have, a question that basically meant whether he had the status of a king or not. R. Hiyya replied: "You have your rival in Babylon", referring to Huna Kamma. The Hebrew word for "rival" (צרה) is also used to describe either of two wives of a single man, indicating that the "nasi" and "exilarch" are positions of equal stature, and thus neither of the two was a sole leader who might be obligated in the Korban Nasi.

Regnal titles
Preceded by Shaphat	5th Babylonian Exilarch abt. 200	Succeeded by Nathan Ukban I
