= Rav Zevid =

- רב זביד (השני)

Personal life
- Died: 385 CE
- Occupation: Rabbi, Talmudist

Religious life
- Religion: Judaism

Jewish leader
- Position: Head of the Academy
- Yeshiva: Pumbedita Academy

Rav Zevid (or Rav Zebid; Hebrew: רב זביד (השני) (died 385 CE), read as Rav Zevid Ha-Sheni, lit. "Rav Zevid II") was an Amora of Babylon of the fourth and fifth generation of the Amora era.

== Biography ==
He was a disciple of Rava and a scholarly opponent of Rav Papa. According to the Iggeret Rav Sherira Gaon, he served as head of the academy of Pumbedita.

He was a contemporary of Abaye, whose halakhot he transmitted, and of whom he was perhaps a pupil. He also transmitted the halakhot of Rava and Rav Nachman. but he particularly preferred the decisions of Abaye, and it is narrated that his adherence to Abaye caused his death. When the people of the exilarch once questioned R. Hiyya Parwa'ah regarding a certain halakhah, he answered that Hezekiah and Bar Kappara had interpreted it, while R. Johanan had decided to the contrary, and that as the authorities thus stood two to one, the law would have to be interpreted according to the majority. Zebid said, however, "Do not listen to him, for Abaye decided according to R. Johanan"; whereupon the people of the exilarch forced Zebid to drink a cup of vinegar, which caused his death.

R. Ḥinena b. R. Iḳa is recorded as his opponent in halakhic decisions. Zebid particularly explained to his pupils the baraitot of R. Hoshaiah or Oshaya.
