= Saul ben Anan =

Karaite Jewish leader

Saul ben Anan (Hebrew: שאול בן ענן) was a Karaite Jewish leader of the eighth century CE. He was the son and successor of Anan ben David. He is styled by the later Karaites nasi (prince) and Rosh ha-golah (exilarch). Saul's activity was unimportant relative to his more famous father and descendants. He is mentioned by Solomon ben Jeroham in his commentary on the Decalogue as having also written a commentary thereon. He is particularly quoted for his opinion with regard to the sixth commandment; namely, that adultery includes connection with any woman not one's own wife or concubine, and is not confined, as in rabbinical law, to connection with another man's wife. Saul was one of the followers of Gnai Baruch, who is supposed as head of Ezra's bet din to have ordained the reading of the Torah on Shabbatot and holy days, beginning in the month of Tishri and terminating with the end of the year.

Saul died about 780 CE. He was the father of the nasi Josiah, and the grandfather of the nasi Jehoshaphat.

== Resources ==
- It contains the following bibliography:

- Julius Fürst, Gesch. des Karäert. i. 61;
- Simchah Pinsker, Liḳḳuṭe Ḳadmoniyyot, p. 44 (Supplement), pp. 53, 106, 186.
