= Yihye =

Yihye or Yihyeh is a Hebrew given name. A variant is Yihyah. Notable people with the name include:

- Yihye Bashiri (died c. 1661), Yemenite Rabbi
- Yihye Haybi (1911–1977), Yemenite photographer

== See also ==
- Yahya (name)
