= Hachemi Djiar =

Algerian politician

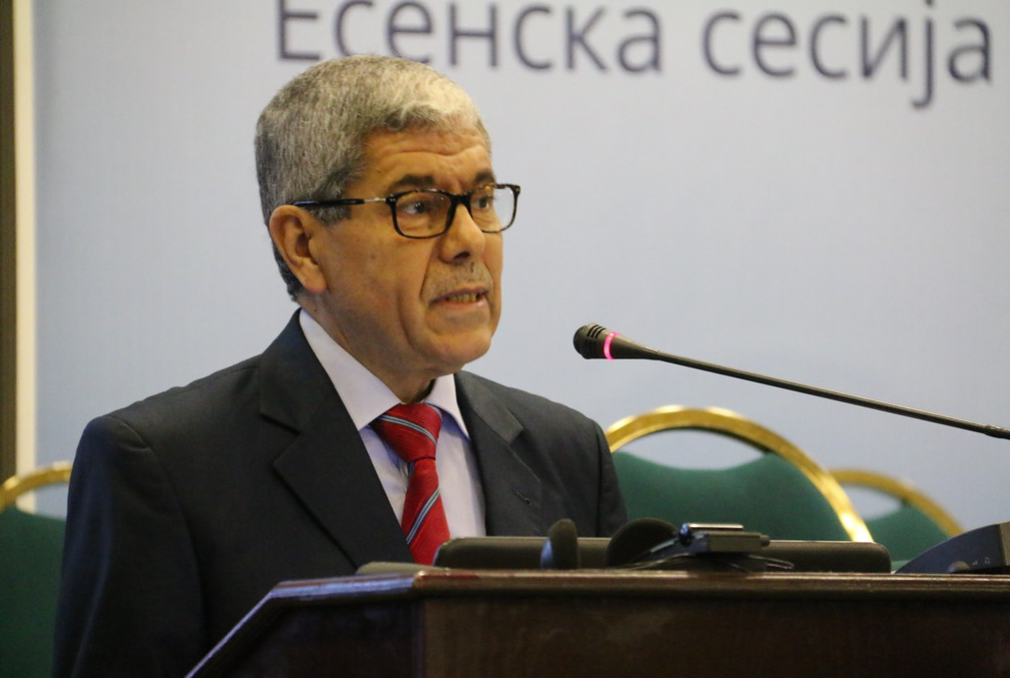
- Djiar speaking to the OSCE in 2016

Minister of Youth and Sports of Algeria
- In office June 4, 2007 – September 3, 2012
- President: Abdelaziz Bouteflika
- Preceded by: Yahia Guidoum
- Succeeded by: Mohamed Tahmi

Minister of Communications
- In office May 25, 2006 – June 4, 2007
- Preceded by: Boujemaa Hishour
- Succeeded by: Abdel Rachid Boukerzaza

12th wali of Algiers Province
- In office September 20, 1987 – July 29, 1990
- Preceded by: Cherif Rahmani
- Succeeded by: Mohamed Ouachene Oussedik

Personal details
- Born: June 2, 1946 (age 79) Batna, Batna Province, French Algeria
- Party: FLN

Hachemi Djiar is an Algerian politician who served as the wali of several Algerian provinces and as Minister of Youth and Sports between 2007 and 2012.

Djiar was born on June 2, 1946, in Batna, French Algeria. His first role in the Algerian government was as advisor to the president in 1975. In 1979, Djiar joined the Ministry of the Interior and served as head of the dairas of Draâ El Mizan and Bordj Menaïel. He then served as the secretary-general of Tizi Ouzou Province, Guelma Province, Sidi Bel Abbès Province, Annaba Province, and Algiers Province. From 1984 to 1987, he served as wali of Boumerdès Province and then from 1987 to 1990 as wali of Algiers Province.

On May 25, 2006, Djiar was named as Communications Minister. He held this position until 2007, when he was elected as a deputy in the People's National Assembly and then appointed as Minister of Youth and Sports that same year. In 2009, Djiar supported the Algerian national football team when they were attacked by Egyptian supporters. Djiar called for calm during the 2011 Algerian self-immolations.

In his free time, Djiar writes in L'Expression, an Algerian newspaper.
