= Yihyah =

Yihyah a Hebrew given name, a variant of Yehya, Yehia, Yahia, Yahya, Yihye, etc. It may refer to:

- Yiḥyah Qafiḥ (1850–1931), Chief Rabbi in Yemen
- Yiḥyah Salaḥ, alternatively Yichya Tzalach; Yehiya Saleh), known by the acronym of Maharitz (1713–1805), rabbi in Yemen
- Yihya Yitzhak Halevi (1867 – 1932)
