= Yehya =

Yehya is a masculine given name of Arabic origin. Notable people with the name include:

== Given name ==
- Yehya Ablikim (born 1988), Chinese footballer
- Yehya Bundhun (born 1965), Mauritian sportsman
- Yehya Mohamed Hassanein (born 1949), Egyptian wrestler
- Yehya Saade (1975–2010), Lebanese film director

== See also ==
- Yahya (name)
- Yihyah
