= Abba bar Dudai =

Abba bar Dudai was head of the Academy of Pumbedita (at the time within the Abbasid Caliphate) from 772 until about 780 CE. Sherira Gaon adds to Abba's name the words "our grandfather", which, however, are not meant to indicate that Dudai was an immediate ancestor of Sherira. A copyist's attempt to change the rare name "Dudai" into "Judai" adds to the confusion; for Judai Gaon, the actual grandfather of Sherira, lived a full century later than Dudai.

| Preceded by Malka ben R. Aha | Gaon of the Pumbedita Academy; 773-782 | Succeeded by Rav Shinwai |
