= Josiah ben Saul =

9th-century Karaite rabbi

Josiah ben Saul (Hebrew: יאשיהו בן שאול) was the grandson of Anan ben David and a Karaite Nasi. Some of his halakhic opinions are quoted by later Karaite scholars. He was the father of Jehoshaphat and Semah, who both functioned as leaders of the Palestinian Gaonate.
