= Golah =

Reference to the Jewish diaspora community in Hebrew

Golah (גּוֹלָה) refers to the Jewish diaspora community. While sharing the same Hebrew letters as the term galut, the terms are not interchangeable: while golah refers to the diaspora itself (and thus, to those who do reside in such a state), the term galut refers to the process of residing in diaspora (that is, to be extricated, or to make voluntary yerida, from the land of Israel), and is mostly synonymous with the English word exile.

The terms golah and galut, however, are the object of controversy within Jewish literature and Jewish politics, as they have become most prominently used since the 20th century within Zionism in its ideological promotion of the negation of the Diaspora.

== See also ==
- Babylonian captivity
