= Mar Ukba ben Judah =

Exilarch at Baghdad in the first half of the tenth century

Mar Ukba ben Judah, also known as Mar Ukban IV (Hebrew: מר עוקבא בן יהודה; early tenth century) was the Babylonian Exilarch from 890 until his banishment in 917 AD. He was briefly reinstated again in the year 918, however the following year he was disposed and succeeded by his contentious cousin, David ben Zakkai.

== Biography ==
Born in the mid-ninth century in Baghdad, Iraq, his father Judah ben David was Exilarch from 840-857, and a fifth-generation descendant of Bostanai. Following his uncle, Zakkai ben Ahunai's death in 890, he succeeded Zakkai as Exilarch, rather than Zakkai's son David, who was deemed too controversial for the position. Mar Ukba's early years as Exilarch were relatively calm, however, following the appointment of Kohen Tzedek Kahana ben Joseph as Pumbedita Gaon in 917, a violent controversy broke out between him and Mar Ukba, over the question of the income of the academy from the region of Khorasan. This ultimately resulted in a boycott by Kohen Tzedek's wealthy and influential friend, Joseph ben Phinehas, who convinced Abbasid Caliph Al-Muqtadir to depose Mar Ukba, which he did in 917. Soon afterward, Mar Ukba moved to Kermanshah in the spring of 917. However, after the young Caliph moved to his summer palace in Safran, Mar Ukba devised a scheme to win the royal favour by meeting Al-Muqtadir's secretary daily in his gardens and greeting him with the recitation of beautiful verses of poetry. These pleased the Caliphs secretary so much that he wrote them down and showed them to his master, who in his turn was so delighted that he sent for Mar Ukba. When the Caliph saw Mar Ukba, he asked him to express any wish. To this, Mar Ukba requested to be reinstated as Exilarch. The Caliph granted this wish, and soon after, Mar Ukba returned to Baghdad, where he was reinstated as Exilarch in 918. However, only a few months after his reinstatement, Kohen Ẓedeḳ and his friends once again succeeded in securing his deposition and banishment from the country. Following this, Mar Ukba moved to Kairouan, Tunisia, where he was received with great esteem as a member of the House of David. In the Kairouan Synagogue, a throne was built or him near the Torah ark, and he was always the third to read the weekly parashah. His immediate descendants are unknown, however, they probably immigrated to Francia. According to Jewish tradition, Yitskhak Eizik Meisels (b. 1425), the progenitor of the Meisels family was a 10th generation descendant of Mar Ukba.
