= Jehoshaphat ben Josiah =

- יהושפט בן יאשיהו
- Title: Nasi, Resh galuta

Personal life
- Children: Boaz ben Jehoshaphat
- Parent: Josiah ben Saul (father)
- Era: Early 9th century
- Region: Land of Israel
- Relatives: Anan ben David (great-grandfather); Semah ben Josiah (brother)

Religious life
- Religion: Judaism

Jewish leader
- Post: Gaon of Palestine
- Successor: Semah ben Josiah

Jehoshaphat ben Josiah (Hebrew: יהושפט בן יאשיהו) was the son of Josiah ben Saul, the great-grandson of Anan ben David, a Nasi, and a Rosh Yeshivah, during the early ninth century. He lived in Israel where he was head of the Palestinian Yeshiva. Jehoshaphat was nasi and resh galuta of the nascent Karaite movement of Judaism, though it is likely that he was a Rabbanite himself due to his affiliation with the Palestinian Yeshiva. He was the father of Boaz ben Jehoshaphat. His brother Semah was head of the Palestinian Gaonate after him.
