= Rav Shizbi =

R. Shezbi (or R. Shezbi; Hebrew: רב שיזבי) was a Babylonian rabbi, of the fourth generation of amoraim.

== Biography ==
It is told that Rav Chisda was accustomed to pass the house of Rav Shizbi's father (according to another version: his father-in-law), and seeing the observance of Shabbat candles, he stated: "a great men will issue hence" (since it is stated that "He who habitually practises [the lighting of] the lamp will possess scholarly sons"), and indeed he had Rav Shizbi. Indeed, Rava would eventually describe Shizbi as being a "great man".

Later Shizbi became a pupil of Rav Chisda, but also debated Halakha before Rabbah.

Aaron Hyman suggests he moved to the Land of Israel for a short period of time, where he studied Torah under Yochanan bar Nafcha.

One should distinguish between this Rav Shizbi, and Rav Shizbi II, who was a pupil of Rava.
