= Rav Shinwai =

Rav Shinwai also spelt Shinui (Hebrew: רב שינוי) was the Gaon of Pumbedita for one year in 782. He is known for answering several important Rabbinic questions throughout the Arabic Jewish world, which have been recorded in a Teshuvot Hagaonim.

== Biography ==
Born in the mid-8th century. In his early years, Rav Shinwai studied outside of the Pumpedita community. However, following the death of Abba bar Dudai, Rav Shinwai moved to Pumpedita to fill the deceased's position, being elected Gaon in 782. During his year in the Gaonate, Rav Shinwai maintained a close relationship with other Arab Jewish communities. However, after a year in the position, Rav Shinwai stepped down and supported the succession of his student, Haninai Kahana ben Abraham.

Preceded by Abba bar Dudai	Gaon of the Pumbedita Academy; 841-858	Succeeded by Haninai Kahana ben Abraham
