= Solomon (exilarch) =

Leader of the Jewish diaspora in Mesopotamia from 730 to 761

Solomon the Exilarch ruled the diasporic Jewish community as exilarch from 730 to 761. He was the son of the exilarch Hasdai I. In consequence of a dearth of teachers, he installed a scholar from Pumbedita as head of the Academy of Sura; this was contrary to traditional practice, however. According to Graetz, this scholar was Mar ben Samuel; according to Weiss, Mar Rab Judah ben Rab Naḥman. In the genealogical claim of Anan ben David, the founder of the Karaite sect, Solomon is omitted.
