= Yahia Guidoum =

Algerian politician (1940/1941–2020)

Minister of Health and Population of Algeria
- In office April 15, 1994 – December 23, 1999
- Preceded by: Mohamed Seghir Babes
- Succeeded by: Amara Benyounes

Minister of Youth and Sports of Algeria
- In office May 1, 2005 – June 4, 2007
- Preceded by: Abdelaziz Ziari
- Succeeded by: Hachemi Djiar

Personal details
- Born: يحيى قيدوم; 1940 or 1941 Constantine, French Algeria (now Algeria)
- Died: March 3, 2020 Constantine, Algeria
- Party: Democratic National Rally
- Occupation: Surgeon

Yahia Guidoum (Arabic: يحيى قيدوم) was an Algerian surgeon and politician who served as the Minister of Youth and Sports from 2005 to 2007 and the Minister of Health from 1994 to 1999.

== Biography ==
Guidoum was born in Constantine in 1940 or 1941. He was a doctor trained in orthopedic surgery, and headed the orthopedics department at Constantine University Hospital. He was a doctor at hospitals in Sétif, Constantine, and Algiers from 1965 to 2008.

At some point, he was Minister of Labor of Algeria. Guidoum served as the Minister of Health and Population from April 15, 1994 to December 23, 1999. From May 1, 2005 to June 4, 2007, he served as the Minister of Youth and Sports. He was part of the National Democratic Rally (RND) party, where he was a senior member.

Guidoum died on March 3, 2020 at the age of 79 in Ibn Badis University Hospital. He was buried in Constantine's Zouargh cemetery. In 2021, a new trauma center was created in Tipaza named after Guidoum.
