= Mar-Zutra III =

Mar-Zutra III, also called Mar-Zutra bar Mar-Zutra, according to the Seder Olam Zutta, was the posthumous and only son of the 30th Exilarch of Babylon, Mar-Zutra II. He lived at the beginning of the Savora period. Mar-Zutra II had been crucified on the bridge of Mahuza by King Kavadh I for allegedly trying to obtain by force of arms a sort of political independence for the Jews of Babylon. Mar-Zutra III, who was born on the same day as his father's death, did not attain the office of exilarch. He was raised secretly and traveled in 520 CE, aged 18, to the Land of Israel. where he became head of the Academy of Tiberias or "Sanhedrin", under the title of "Resh Pirka" ('Aρχιφεκίτησ), several generations of his descendants succeeding him in this office. His grandson, Paltoi ben Abaye and great-grandson, Zemah ben Paltoi both served as the Gaon of Pumbedita.
