= Yahia Ben Yahi III =

Chief-Rabbi of Portugal

Yahia Ben Yahi III, also known as Jahia Negro Ibn Ya'isch, was a Sephardi Jew born in Cordoba, Al-Andalus, also known as Yahya Ha-Nasi, Yahya Ibn Yaish or Dom Yahia "o Negro", (known as Lord of the Aldeia dos Negros, Portugal – English: Village of the Blacks), the son of Yahia Ben Rabbi and said to be a direct descendant of the Exilarchs of Babylon.

King Afonso I of Portugal entrusted Yahia Ben Yahi III with the post of supervisor of tax collection and nominated him the first Chief-Rabbi of Portugal. King Sancho I of Portugal continued his father's policy, making Joseph Ben Yahia, the grandson of Yahia Ben Rabbi, High Steward of the Realm. The clergy, however, invoking the restrictions of the Fourth Council of the Lateran, brought considerable pressure to bear against the Jews during the reign of King Dinis I of Portugal, but the monarch maintained a conciliatory position. Yahia ben Yahi III died in 1185 in Lisbon, Portugal.
