= Al-Hiti =

Egyptian-Iraqi chronicler

David al-Hiti is the nickname of a Karaite Jewish chronicler who flourished (probably in Egypt) in the first half of the fifteenth century CE. He was a native of Hīt, Iraq (whence his surname), on the Euphrates River about thirty leagues to the west of Baghdad. He is supposed by Margoliouth to be identical with David ben Sa'adel ben Joseph, the writer of a manuscript (dated 811 A.H. = 1408–09) quoted by Pinsker (Liḳḳuṭe Ḳadmoniyyot, p. 64). Margoliouth further assumes that al-Hiti was a son of Joshua ibn Sa'adel ibn al-Hiti, who is cited by Solomon ben Jeroham, the adversary of Saadia Gaon. Al-Hiti was the author of a chronicle in which he registered all the Karaite scholars and their works down to Samuel al-Maghrabi. Although the author was misled in some important points, his work furnishes valuable information concerning well-known Karaite scholars, and mentions a great number of previously unknown names. Al-Hiti's chronicle was published by Margoliouth from a Cairo Genizah fragment (J. Q. R. ix.429).

== Resources ==
- Gottheil, Richard and Isaac Broydé. "Hiti, al-". Jewish Encyclopedia. Funk and Wagnalls, 1901–1906.
