= David ben Zakkai =

10th-century Babylonian Exilarch

David ben Zakkai (died 940 CE) was an exilarch, leader of the Jewish community of Babylon, known in Jewish history especially for his conflict with Saadia Gaon, which ruptured the leadership of the Babylonian Jews, and which was settled by the intervention of the Abbasid Caliph Al-Qahir.

He was banished to Khorasan, where he died.

== Biographical details ==
He was a relative of the Prince of the Exile, 'Uḳba, who had been deposed from office and banished, and was his successor in the exilarchate.

== Exilarchate ==
The office of Exilarch was at this time confronted by a dangerous adversary in the person of the passionate and ambitious gaon Mar Kohen-Zedek (in office 917–936), who attempted to make the Academy of Pumbedita the only center of the Babylonian Jews, thereby threatening the existence of the sister academy of Sura. He, as well as the Academy of Pumbedita, refused to recognize David as exilarch, whereupon the latter, who was equally resolute and ambitious, deposed Kohen-Ẓedeḳ and appointed another gaon.

This dispute lasted for two years, until Nissim Naharwani, highly respected for his piety, intervened and reconciled the adversaries, peace being concluded at Sarsar (half a day's journey south of Baghdad). Kohen-Ẓedeḳ and his college accompanied the exilarch as far as Baghdad (in the fall of 921); David ben Zakkai, in turn, recognizing the former as gaon of Pumbedita. But the reputation of the Academy of Sura continued to dwindle.

== Relationship with Saadia Gaon ==
A weaver filled the office of gaon for two years (926-928), and the ancient and famous academy of Sura was on the point of being dissolved, when Saadia, called from Egypt by the exilarch, was appointed gaon. This was against the advice of Naharwani, who favored Ẓemaḥ ibn Shahin ("Medieval Jew. Chron." ii. 80); but the wisdom of the choice was shown when Saadia made the fame of Sura surpass even that of Pumbedita.

== Inheritance case ==
The friendly relations between David ben Zakkai and Saadia were soon disturbed. David shrank from nothing which might strengthen his position, and misused his influence in order to extort large contributions from the community. A case of inheritance which David had decided illegally for reasons of self-interest, led to a rupture between the two. The exilarch asked the two geonim to sign the document in question. Kohen-Ẓedeḳ dared not refuse, but Saadia did. David deposed Saadia from office and banished him, appointing in his place the insignificant Joseph b. Jacob b. Satia. Saadia, however, took up the gauntlet; he, in turn, deposed David, and, together with his followers, appointed David's brother, Josiah Ḥasan, as exilarch.

The Babylonian Jews were now divided into two parties, each of which appealed to the caliph Al-Muḳtadir. His successor, Al-Ḳahir, finally decided the case. The opposing exilarch was banished to Khorasan, where later on he died; and Saadia was deprived of his gaonate (beginning of 933).

== Resolution ==
Saadia went to Bagdad, devoting the four years of his involuntary leisure to research. He was reinstated in consequence of a law case in which one of the parties concerned chose the exilarch as judge, while the other chose Saadia, whereupon David had the man maltreated who appealed to his adversary. This caused general excitement, and restoration of peace between the two became imperative. A reconciliation took place on February 27, 937. The opposing gaon was removed from office, and Saadia forgot his injuries. After the exilarch's death Saadia even voted for his son Judah as his successor.

== Calendar controversy ==
David took part in the controversy with Ben Meïr in regard to the fixing of the calendar; and he was one of those who excommunicated the agitator (see "Rev. Et. Juives," xl. 261, xlii. 182).
