= Mar Ukva =

- Born: Babylonia
- Other names: Nathan de-zuzita
- Occupation(s): Exilarch, Rabbi, Av Beit Din
- Known for: Amora of Babylon, first generation of the Amora era, righteousness and discreet charity
- Notable work: Contributions to the Talmud, rulings on tzedakah and judicial conduct

Mar Ukva (or Mar Ukba; other: Mar Ukva (I); also identified with Nathan de-zuzita) was an Amora of Babylon, of the first generation of the Amora era.

== Biography ==
He served as an Exilarch during the days of Samuel of Nehardea, who was also his Rabbi, but at the same time, Samuel was subordinated to Mar Ukva in Ukva's capacity as "Av Beit Din" (chief of the rabbinical court) and its second-highest-ranking member. He resided at Kafri city, Babylonia, about 20 km south of Sura, where his rabbinical court was also located. He was very strict about refusing any action that could be interpret as a bribe to him by one of the parties in a case.

He was appointed exilarch after R. Huna Kamma died. Some say that he was Huna Kamma's son, but this is not explicit in the sources.

In the Talmud it is said that he was a righteous man and used to give tzedakah anonymously, in order not to shame the needy he handed the charity to. As a disciple of Samuel of Nehardea, he also had knowledge in medicine.

His greatest student was Rav Chisda, who quotes him often. Another student was Rav Zeira. The Talmud mentions the "sons of Mar Ukva" in several places, one son named Rav Natan is named, and one source names "Mari son of Mar Ukva" though Dikdukei Sofrim suggests that the correct text here is "Mari son of Mar said in the name of Mar Ukva" implying that Mari had a different father. When Mar Ukva died he left behind orphan children, and Samuel of Nehardea became their guardian.

== Quotes ==
- Whoever prays on Shabbat eve and says Vayechulu, two ministering angels accompany him and put their hands on his head and say to him: "Your sin has departed, your transgression is atoned."
- Whoever speaks lashon hara, the Holy One (blessed be He) says "I and he cannot dwell in the world together".

Regnal titles
Preceded by Huna I Kamma	6th Babylonian Exilarch abt. 226	Succeeded by Huna II
