= Exilarch =

Leader of the Jewish community in Mesopotamia

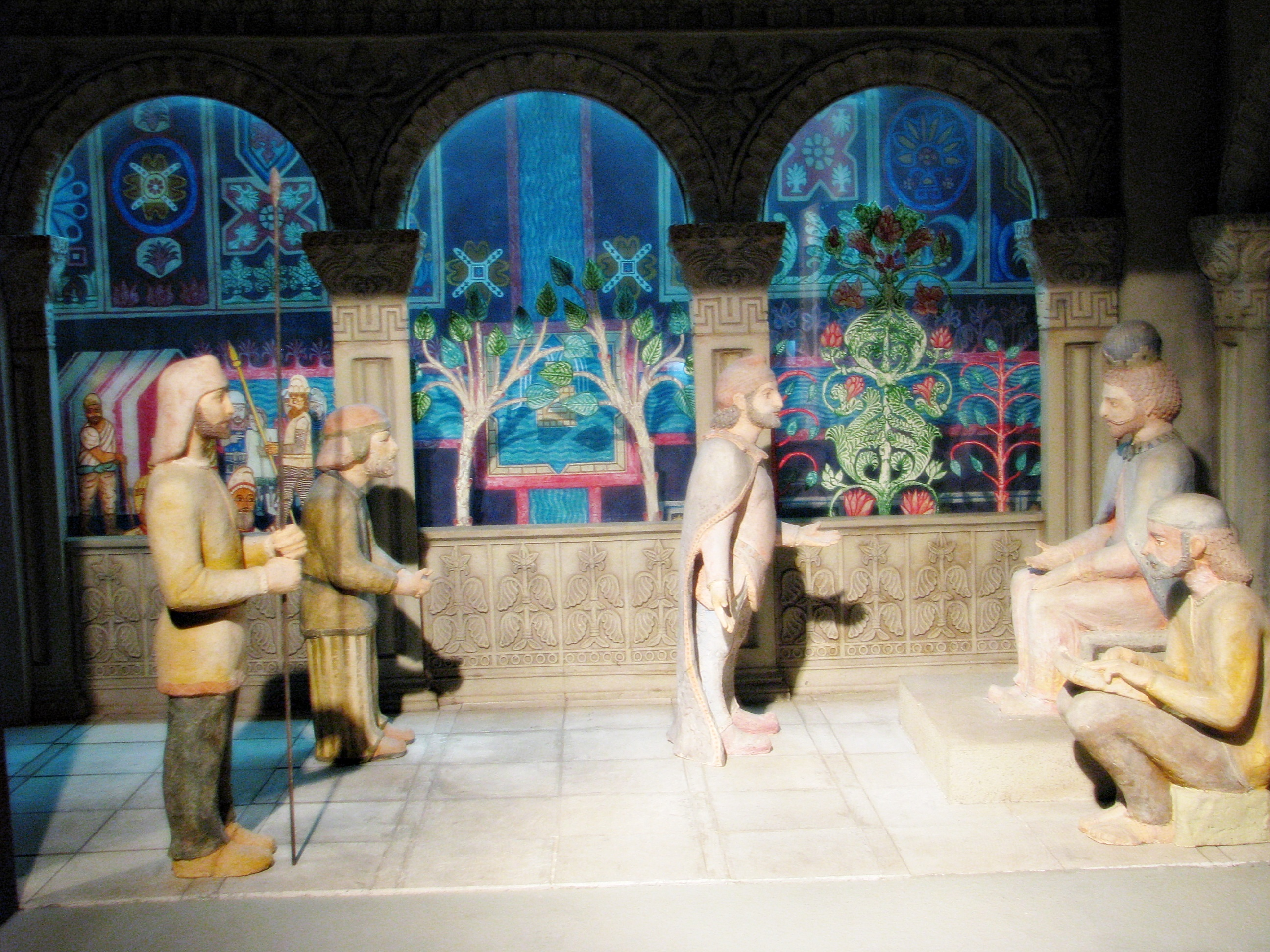
An exhibit depicting Exilarch Huna at the Beit Hatfutsot

The exilarch (Note: Hebrew: ראש הגולה, romanized: rōʾš ha-gôlā, lit. 'head [of] the exile'; Jewish Babylonian Aramaic: ריש גלותא, romanized: rēš galûtā) was the leader of the Jewish community in Mesopotamia (modern-day Iraq) during the Parthian and Sasanian Empires and Abbasid Caliphate up until the 1258 CE Mongol invasion of Baghdad, with intermittent gaps due to ongoing political developments. The exilarch was regarded by the Jewish community as the royal heir of the Davidic line and held prominence as both a rabbinical authority and a noble within the Persian and Arab courts.

Within the Sasanian Empire, the exilarch was the political equivalent of the Catholicos of the Church of the East and was thus responsible for community-specific organizational tasks such as running the rabbinical courts, collecting taxes from Jewish communities, supervising and providing financing for the Talmudic academies in Babylonia, and the charitable re-distribution and financial assistance to needy members of the exile community. The position of exilarch was hereditary, held in continuity by a family that traced its patrilineal descent from antiquity stemming from King David.

The first historical documents referring to it date from the time when Babylonia was part of the late Parthian Empire. The office first appears in the 2nd century and continues through the middle of the 6th century under different Persian dynasties (the Parthians and Sassanids). In the late 5th and early 6th centuries, Mar-Zutra II briefly ruled a politically independent state from Mahoza for about 7 years. He was eventually defeated by Kavadh I, King of Persia, and the office of the exilarch was diminished for some time thereafter. The position was restored to prominence in the 7th century, under the rule of the Arab Caliphate, and the office of exilarch continued to be appointed by Arab authorities through the 11th century.

The exilarch's authority came under considerable challenge in 825 during the reign of al-Ma'mun who issued a decree permitting a group of ten men from any religious community to organize separately, which allowed the Gaon of the Talmudic academies of Sura and Pumbedita to compete with the exilarch for power and influence, later contributing to the wider schism between Karaites and Rabbinic Jewry.

== Title ==
The word exilarch is a Greco-Latin calque of the Hebrew Rosh HaGola (ראש הגולה), literally meaning 'head of the exile'. The position was similarly called in Aramaic (Imperial Aramaic: ריש גלותא, romanized: Reysh Galuta or Resh Galvata) and Arabic (Arabic: رأس الجالوت, romanized: Raas al-Galut). It was translated into Persian as سر جالوت. The Jewish people in exile were referred to as golah (as in, e.g., Jeremiah 28:6 and Jeremiah 29:1) or galut. The contemporary Greek term that was used was Aechmalotarches (Αἰχμαλωτάρχης), literally meaning the 'leader of the captives'. The Greek term has continued to be applied to the office, notwithstanding changes to the position over time, which were largely titular.

== Development and organization ==
Although there is no mention of the office before the 2nd century, the Seder Olam Zutta alleges that the office of exilarch was established following the deportation of King Jeconiah and his court into exile in Babylon after the first fall of Jerusalem in 597 BCE and augmented after the further deportations following the destruction of the kingdom of Judah in 587. The history of the Babylonian exilarchate falls into two separate identifiable periods: before and after the beginning of the Arabic rule of Babylonia. Nothing is known about the office before the 2nd century, when it is first referenced in the Talmud, including any details about its origins. It can merely be said in general that the golah ("diaspora"), the Jews living in compact masses in various parts of Babylon, tended gradually to unite and create an organization, and that this tendency, together with the high regard in which the descendants of the house of David living in Babylon were held, brought it about that a member of this house was recognized as "head of the golah". The dignity became hereditary in this house and was finally recognized by the state, and hence became an established political institution, first of the Arsacid Empire and then the Sassanid.

Such was the exilarchate as it appears in the Talmudic literature, which is the chief source for its history during the first period, and the only source of information regarding the rights and functions of the exilarchate. There is also description of the institution of the exilarchate for the second period, under the Arabs (see the sections Installation ceremonies and Income and privileges). This description is also important for the first period as many of the details may be regarded as having persisted from it.

In Baghdad, the privilege of using seals was limited to the exilarch and geonim. Serving under the authority of the caliph, they were extremely powerful as the highest authority for the Jewish people in the Caliphate. The use of seals was not limited to internal matters; their authority was recognized by Muslims as well. Based on the account of Benjamin of Tudela:

At the head of them all [the Jews under the Baghdad caliphate] is Daniel the son of Hisdai, who is styled "Our Lord the Head of the Captivity of all Israel." ... he has been invested with authority over all the congregations of Israel at the hands of the Emir al Muminim, the Lord of Islam.

== Holders of the office ==
=== Biblical exilarchs ===
The following are exilarchs mentioned in the Seder Olam Zutta; most are likely legendary figures and have parallels in the text of 1 Chronicles 3:

- Jeconiah or Jehoiachin, one of the last of the Davidic kings of Judah
- Shealtiel, son of Jehoiachin (1 Chronicles 3:17)
- Pedaiah, son of She'alti'el (1 Chronicles 3:17)
- Zerubbabel, son of Pedaiah, who was a son of Jehoiachin (1 Chronicles 3:17–19, Haggai 1:1) and is mentioned as a governor of the Persian Yehud province. According to the Seder Olam Zutta, Zerubbabel was the son of Shealtiel
- Mishullum, son of Zerubbavel (1 Chronicles 3:19)
- Chananya, son of Mishullum (1 Chronicles 3:19)
- Berachiya, son of Chananya (1 Chronicles 3:19–20)
- Hasadaiya, son of Berachiya (1 Chronicles 3:21)
- Yishaiya, son of Hasadaiya (1 Chronicles 3:21)
- Ovadyah, son of Arnan, son of Refaiya, son of Chananya, son of Zerubavel. (1 Chronicles 3:21)
- Shemaiah, son of Ovadya according to the Seder Olam Zutta
- Shechanya, the son of Shemaiya, according to the Seder Olam Zutta and lived at the time of the destruction of the Second Temple
- Hezekiah, son of Shechanya according to the Seder Olam Zutta
- Akuv, son of Elyo'aynai, son of Niarya, son of Shemaiya, son of Shechanya, son of Ovadya, the son of Arnan, son of refaiya, son of Chananya, son of Zerubavel, according to the Seder Olam Zutta, perhaps the same as Ahijah listed below

=== Rabbinic exilarchs under the Sassanids ===
Probably-historical exilarchs listed in the Seder Olam Zutta or otherwise noted in the Talmud:

- Ahijah, not mentioned in the Seder Olam Zutta but referred to in the Talmud
- Nahum, probably the same person known as Nehunyon, roughly from the time of the Hadrianic persecution (135 CE)
- Johanan, brother of Nahum, who had jurisdictional issues with the Sanhedrin's authority
- Shaphat, son of Johanan
- Huna Kamma, also called Anan or Anani, son of Shaphat He is the first exilarch explicitly mentioned as such in Talmudic literature; a contemporary of Judah ha-Nasi. Died c. 210 CE.
- Nathan Ukban I, living in 226, sometimes confused with Nathan de-Zuzita, son of Shaphat
- Huna II, son of Nathan Ukban I, died in 297, also Gaon of the academy of Sura
- Nathan Ukban II, son of Huna II
- Nehemiah reigning in 313, son of Huna II
- Mar 'Ukban III, sometimes confused with Nathan de-Zuzita, reigning in 337, son of Nehemiah
- Huna III, son of Nehemiah, also known as Huna bar Nathan. Known to the Sassanid court.
- Abba, also known as Abemar, son of Huna III
- Nathan, son of Abba
- Mar Kahana I, son of Abba
- Huna IV, son of Mar Kahana I, died 441
- Pahda, a non-Davidic usurper
- Mar Zutra I, brother of Huna IV
- Merimar, son of Mar Zutra I
- Kahana II, son of Merimar
- Huna V, son of Mar Zutra I; executed by Peroz I of Persia in 470
- Mar Zutra II, crucified 520 or 502 CE by Kavadh I
- Huna VI, son of Kahana II, was not installed for some time because of persecution. Possibly identical to Huna V. Died in the plague of 508
- Mar Ahunai, did not dare to appear in public for 30 years. Also referred to as Huna VII
- Kafnai (or Hofnai), the second half of the 6th century
- Haninai I 580 to 590–591; put to death in 590–591 by Khosrau II for supporting Bahram VI, according to Karaite sources
- Mar-Zutra III, son of David, son of Hezekiah, son of Huna, who left Babylonia altogether

=== Rabbinical exilarchs under Arab rule ===
- Bostanai, son of Haninai, first of the exilarchs under Arab rule, middle of the 7th century starting around 640 CE
- Hasdai I, son of Bostanai
- Baradoi, son of Bostanai
- Haninai II, son of Baradoi
- Hasdai II, son of Baradoi
- Solomon I son of Ḥasdai I, died in 759
- Isaac Iskawi I, son of Solomon
- Judah Zakkai I (or Judah Babawai), son of Isaac Iskawi I
- Natronai I, Son of Haninai II
- Moses, son of Isaac Iskawi I
- Isaac Iskawi II, son of Moses
- David I, son of Judah Zakkai I
- Natronai II, son of Judah Zakkai I
- Judah II, son of David I
- Hasdai III, son of Natronai II
- Zakkai I, son of David I
- Mar Ukban IV, deposed, reinstated 918, deposed again shortly after
- David II took power in 921, and his brother Josiah (Al-Hasan) was elected anti-exilarch in 930, but David prevailed. David ben Zakkai was the last exilarch to play an important political role in Jewish history. His son Judah survived him only by seven months. At the time of Judah's death, he left a 12-year-old son whose name is unknown. A later exilarch, Hezekiah I, also became gaon of Pumbedita in 1038, but was imprisoned and tortured to death in 1040
- Josiah, son of Zakkai
- Judah III, son of David II
- Solomon II, son of Josiah
- Hezekiah I, son of Judah III
- Azariah, son of Solomon II
- David III, son of Hezekiah I
- Hezekiah II, son of David III
- David IV, son of Hezekiah II
- Hezekiah III, son of David IV
- David V, son of Hezekiah III
- Hasdai IV, son of David V, also called Solomon at times
- Daniel I, son of Hasdai IV, whom Benjamin of Tudela makes a note of in his journeys
- Zakkai II
- Samuel I of Mosul
- David VI, son of Samuel I
- Daniel II, son of Zakkai II
- Samuel II, son of David VI or Azariah
- Jesse, defended Moses ben Maimon's work against the slander of Solomon ben Samuel Petit
- Sar Shalom, son of Pinhas

=== Karaite exilarchs ===
The following is a list of Karaite exilarchs beginning in the 8th century, after the end of the tenure of the exilarch David I:

- Anan ben David, son of David ben Judah (c. 715 – c. 795 or 811?), considered to be a major founder of the Karaite movement
- Saul ben Anan, son of Anan ben David, 8th century
- Josiah, son of Saul ben Anan
- Jehoshaphat ben Josiah, son of Josiah ben Saul, holding office during the early 9th century
- Boaz ben Jehoshaphat, son of Jehoshaphat ben Josiah, mid-9th century
- David ben Boaz, son of Boaz ben Jehoshaphat, 10th century
- Solomon ben David, son of David ben Boaz, late 10th and early 11th centuries.
- Hezekiah ben Solomon, son of Solomon ben David, sometime in the 11th century
- Hasdai ben Hezekiah, son of Hezekiah ben Solomon, sometime in the 11th and 12th centuries
- Solomon ben Hasdai, son of Hasdai ben Hezekiah. During his tenure, many Karaite communities were destroyed by the Seljuks invasion

== History ==
=== Legendary origins ===
The Seder Olam Zuta states that the first exilarch was Jehoiachin, the king of Judah who was carried off to captivity in Babylonia in 433 BCE, wherein he established his residence at the city of Nehardea in Babylonia. This chronicle, written c. 800, presents a legendary origin to the early history of the house of the Babylonian exilarch. The captive king's advancement at Evil-Merodach's court—with which the narrative of the Second Book of Kings closes (2 Kings 25:27)—was regarded by the author of the Seder 'Olam Zuta as the origin of the office, and the basis for the exilarch's authority. A list of generations of the descendants of the king is given in the text, which closely parallels the names found in I Chronicles 3:17 et seq.

A commentary to the Chronicles dating from the school of Saadia Gaon quotes Judah ibn Kuraish to the effect that the genealogical list of the descendants of David was added to the book at the end of the period of the Second Temple, a view which was shared by the author of the list of Babylonian exilarchs in Seder 'Olam Zuta. This list attempts to bridge the 700-year gap between Jehoiachin and the first exilarch mentioned in written sources, Nahum. It grants some specific hallmarks chronologically connecting personalities with the history of the Second Temple, such as Shechaniah, who is mentioned as having lived at the time of the Temple's destruction. The following are enumerated as his predecessors in office: Salathiel, Zerubbabel, Meshullam, Hananiah, Berechiah, Hasadiah, Jesaiah, Obadiah, and Shemaiah, Shecaniah, and Hezekiah. All of these names are also found in I Chron. 3., albeit in a confabulated order. This list cannot be historical given the limited number of generations presented. The name Akkub is also found at the end of the Davidic list in the Seder Olam Zuta, which is followed by Nahum, with whom the historic portion of the list begins, and who may be roughly assigned to the time of the destruction of Jerusalem (135). This is the period in which the first allusions in rabbinical literature are found to the office of the exilarch.

=== First allusions in the Jerusalem Talmud ===
In the account referring to the attempt of a teacher of the Law from the land of Israel, Hananiah, nephew of Joshua ben Hananiah, to render the Babylonian Jews independent of the Sanhedrin, the religious and political authority residing in the land of Judea, a man named 'Ahijah' is mentioned as the temporal head of the Babylonian Jews, possibly, one of the first historic exilarchs. Another rabbinical source substitutes the name Nehunyon for Ahijah. It is likely that this 'Nehunyon' is identical with the Nahum mentioned in the list. The political danger threatening the Sanhedrin eventually passed. At about this same time, Rabbi Nathan, a member of the house of exilarch, came to Galilee, where the Sanhedrin met and where the Nasi resided following the Jewish expulsion from Jerusalem. By virtue of his rabbinical scholarship, he was soon classed among the foremost tannaim of the post-Hadrianic epoch. His supposed Davidic genealogical origins suggested to Rabbi Meïr the plan of making the Babylonian scholar nasi (prince) in place of the Hillelite Simon ben Gamaliel. However, the conspiracy against the reigning Nasi failed. Rabbi Nathan was subsequently among the confidants of the Hillelite patriarchal house and the teacher of Simon ben Gamaliel's son, Judah I (also known as Judah haNasi).

Rabbi Meïr's attempt, however, seems to have led Judah I to fear that the Babylonian exilarch might come to Judea to claim the office from Hillel the Elder's descendant. He discussed the subject with the Babylonian scholar Hiyya, a prominent member of his school, saying that he would pay due honor to the exilarch should the latter come but that he would not renounce the office of nasi in his favor. When the body of the exilarch Huna, who was the first incumbent of that office explicitly mentioned as such in Talmudic literature, was brought to Judea during the time of Judah I, Hiyya drew upon himself Judah's deep resentment by announcing the fact to him with the words "Huna is here". A tannaitic exposition of Genesis 49:10 which contrasts the Babylonian exilarchs, ruling by force, with Hillel's descendants, teaching in public, evidently intends to cast a negative reflection on the former. However, Judah I had to listen at his own table to the statement of the youthful sons of the Hiyya above about the same tannaitic exposition, that "the Messiah can not appear until the exilarchate at Babylon and the patriarchate at Jerusalem shall have ceased".

=== Succession of exilarchs ===
According to the Seder Olam Zutta Nahum was followed by his brother Johanan, both of whom are called sons of Akkub in the text. Johanan's son Shaphat is listed next, who was succeeded by Anan, his son. Given the chronological similarities, the identification of the exilarch Anan with the Huna of the Talmud account is very likely. At the time of Anan's successor Nathan Ukban I, according to the Seder Olam Zuta, occurred the fall of the Parthian Empire and the founding of the Sassanid dynasty in 226 CE, which is noted as follows in Seder Olam Zutta: "In the year 166 after the destruction of the Temple (c. CE 234) the Persian Empire advanced upon the Romans" (on the historical value of this statement. Nathan 'Ukban, also known as Mar 'Ukban, was the contemporary of Rav and Samuel, who also occupied a prominent position among the scholars of Babylon' and, according to Sherira Gaon, was also exilarch. As 'Ukban's successor is mentioned in the list his son (Huna II), whose chief advisers were Rav (died 247) and Samuel (died 254), and in whose time Papa ben Nazor destroyed Nehardea. Huna's son and successor, Nathan, whose chief advisers were Judah ben Ezekiel (died 299) and Shesheth, was called, like his grandfather, "Mar 'Ukban", and it is he, the second exilarch of this name, whose curious correspondence with Eleazar ben Pedat is referred to in the Talmud. He was succeeded by his brother (not his son, as stated in Seder Olam Zutta); his leading adviser was Shezbi. The "exilarch Nehemiah" is also mentioned in the Talmud; he is the same person as "Rabbanu Nehemiah", and he and his brother "Rabbeinu 'Ukban" (Mar Ukban II) are several times mentioned in the Talmud as sons of Rav's daughter (hence Huna II was Rav's son-in-law) and members of the house of the exilarchs.

=== The Mar Ukbans ===
According to Seder Olam Zutta, in Nehemiah's time, the 245th year after the destruction of the Temple (313 CE), there took place a great religious persecution by the Persians, of which, however, no details are known. Nehemiah was succeeded by his son Mar 'Ukban III, whose chief advisers were Rabbah ben Nahmani (died 323) and Adda. He is mentioned as "'Ukban ben Nehemiah, resh galuta", in the Talmud. This Mar 'Ukban, the third exilarch of that name, was also called "Nathan", as were the first two, and has been made the hero of a legend under the name of "Nathan de-Ẓuẓita". The conquest of Armenia (337) by Shapur (Sapor) II is mentioned in the chronicle as a historical event occurring during the time of Nathan Ukban III.

He was succeeded by his brother Huna Mar (Huna III), whose chief advisers were Abaye (died 338) and Raba; then followed Mar Ukban's son Abba, whose chief advisers were Raba (died 352) and Rabina. During Abba's time King Sapor conquered Nisibis. The designation of a certain Isaac as resh galuta in the time of Abaye and Raba is due to a clerical error [Brüll's Jahrbuch, vii. 115], and is therefore omitted from lists. Abba was succeeded first by his son Nathan and then by another son, Kahana I. The latter's son Huna is then mentioned as successor, being the fourth exilarch of that name; he died in 441, according to a trustworthy source, the "Seder Tannaim wa-Amoraim". Hence he was a contemporary of Rav Ashi, the great master of Sura, who died in 427. In the Talmud, however, Huna ben Nathan is mentioned as Ashi's contemporary, and according to Sherira it was he who was Mar Kahana's successor, a statement which is also confirmed by the Talmud. The statement of Seder Olam Zutta ought perhaps to be emended, since Huna was probably not the son of Mar Kahana, but the son of the latter's elder brother Nathan.

=== Persecutions under Peroz and Kobad ===
Huna was succeeded by his brother Mar Zutra, whose chief adviser was Ahai of Diphti, the same who was defeated in 455 by Ashi's son Tabyomi (Mar) at the election for director of the school of Sura. Mar Zutra was succeeded by his son Kahana (Kahana II), whose chief adviser was Rabina, the editor of the Babylonian Talmud (died 499). Then followed two exilarchs by the same name: another son of Mar Zutra, Huna V, and a grandson of Mar Zutra, Huna VI, the son of Kahana.

Huna V fell a victim to the persecutions under King Peroz (Firuz) of Persia, being executed, according to Sherira, in 470; Huna VI was not installed in office until some time later, the exilarchate being vacant during the persecutions under Peroz; he died in 508 [Sherira]. The Seder Olam Zutta connects with the birth of his son Mar Zutra the legend that is elsewhere told in connection with Bostanai's birth.

Mar Zutra II, who came into office at the age of fifteen, took advantage of the confusion into which Mazdak's communistic attempts had plunged Persia, to obtain by force of arms for a short time a sort of political independence for the Jews of Babylon. King Kobad, however, punished him by crucifying him on the bridge of Mahuza (c. 502). A son was born to him on the day of his death, who was also named "Mar Zutra". The latter did not attain to the office of exilarch, but went to the land of Israel, where he became head of the Academy of Tiberias, under the title of "Resh Pirka" ('Aρχιφεκίτησ), several generations of his descendants succeeding him in this office.

After Mar Zutra's death the exilarchate of Babylon remained unoccupied for some time. Mar Ahunai lived in the period succeeding Mar Zutra II, but for almost fifty years after the catastrophe he did not dare to appear in public, and it is not known whether even then (c. 550) he really acted as exilarch. At any rate the chain of succession of those who inherited the office was not broken. The names of Kafnai and his son Haninai, who were exilarchs in the second half of the 6th, have been preserved.

Haninai's posthumous son Bostanai was the first of the exilarchs under Arabic rule. Bostanai was the ancestor of the exilarchs who were in office from the time when the Persian empire was conquered by the Arabs, in 642, down to the 11th century. Through him, the splendor of the office was renewed and its political position made secure. His tomb in Pumbedita was a place of worship as late as the 12th century, according to Benjamin of Tudela.

Not much is known regarding Bostanai's successors down to the time of Saadia except their names; even the name of Bostanai's son is not known. The list of the exilarchs down to the end of the 9th century is given as follows in an old document: "Bostanai, Hanina ben Adoi, Hasdai I, Solomon, Isaac Iskawi I, Judah Zakkai (Babawai), Moses, Isaac Iskawi II, David ben Judah, Hasdai II."

Hasdai I was probably Bostanai's grandson. The latter's son Solomon had a deciding voice in the appointments to the gaonate of Sura in the years 733 and 759 [Sherira]. Isaac Iskawi I died very soon after Solomon. In the dispute between David's sons Anan and Hananiah regarding the succession the latter was victor; Anan then proclaimed himself anti-exilarch, was imprisoned, and founded the etc. of the Karaites. So says the Jewish Encyclopedia of 1906; the origin of the Karaites is not uncontroversial. His descendants were regarded by the Karaites as the true exilarchs. The following list of Karaite exilarchs, father being succeeded always by son, is given in the genealogy of one of these "Karaite princes": Anan, Saul, Josiah, Boaz, Jehoshaphat, David, Solomon, Hezekiah, Hasdai, Solomon II. Anan's brother Hananiah is not mentioned in this list.

Judah Zakkai, who is called "Zakkai ben Ahunai" by Sherira, had as rival candidate Natronai ben Habibai, who, however, was defeated and sent West in banishment; this Natronai was a great scholar, and, according to tradition, while in Spain wrote the Talmud from memory. David ben Judah also had to contend with an anti-exilarch, Daniel by name. The fact that the decision in this dispute rested with the calif Al-Ma'mun (825) indicates a decline in the power of the exilarchate. David ben Judah, who carried off the victory, appointed Isaac ben Hiyya as Gaon at Pumbedita in 833. Preceding Hasdai II's name in the list that of his father Natronai must be inserted. Both are designated as exilarchs in a geonic responsum.

=== Deposition of 'Ukba ===
Ukban IV is mentioned as exilarch immediately following the death of Hasdai II; he was deposed at the instigation of Kohen-Zedek, Gaon of Pumbedita, but was reinstated in 918 on account of some Arabic verses with which he greeted the caliph al-Muqtadir. He was deposed again soon afterwards, and fled to Kairwan, where he was treated with great honor by the Jewish community there.

'Ukba's nephew, David II, became exilarch; but he had to contend for nearly two years with Kohen-Zedek before he was finally confirmed in his power (921). In consequence of Saadia's call to the gaonate of Sura and his controversy with David, the latter has become one of the best-known personages of Jewish history. Saadia had David's brother Josiah (Al-Hasan) elected anti-exilarch in 930, but the latter was defeated and banished to Chorasan. David ben Zakkai was the last exilarch to play an important part in history. He died a few years before Saadia; his son Judah died seven months afterward.

Judah left a son (whose name is not mentioned) twelve years of age, whom Saadia took into his house and educated. His generous treatment of the grandson of his former adversary was continued until Saadia's death in 942.

=== Diminished power of the Babylonian exilarchate ===
When Gaon Hai died in 1038, nearly a century after Saadia's death, the members of his academy could not find a more worthy successor than the exilarch Hezekiah, a great-grandson of David ben Zakkai, who thereafter filled both offices. But two years later, in 1040, Hezekiah, who was the last exilarch and also the last Gaon, fell a victim to calumny by a peer. He was imprisoned and tortured to death. Two of his sons fled to Spain, where they found refuge with Joseph, the son and successor of Samuel ha-Nagid. Alternatively, Jewish Quarterly Review mentions that Hezekiah was liberated from prison, and became head of the academy, and is mentioned as such by a contemporary in 1046.

=== Later traces ===
The title of exilarch is found occasionally even after the Babylonian exilarchate had ceased. Abraham ibn Ezra speaks of the "Davidic house" at Baghdad (before 1140), calling its members the "heads of the Exile". Benjamin of Tudela in 1170 mentions the Exilarch Hasdai, among whose pupils was the subsequent pseudo-Messiah David Alroy, and Hasdai's son, the Exilarch Daniel. Pethahiah of Regensburg also refers to the latter, but under the name of "Daniel ben Solomon"; hence it must be assumed that Hasdai was also called "Solomon". Yehuda Alharizi (after 1216) met at Mosul a descendant of the house of David, whom he calls "David, the head of the Exile".

A long time previously a descendant of the ancient house of exilarchs had attempted to revive in Fatimid Egypt the dignity of exilarch which had become extinct in Babylon. This was David ben Daniel; he came to Egypt at the age of twenty, in 1081, and was proclaimed exilarch by the learned Jewish authorities of that country, who wished to divert to Egypt the leadership formerly enjoyed by Babylon. A contemporary document, the Megillah of the gaon Abiathar from the land of Israel, gives an authentic account of this episode of the Egyptian Exilarchate, which ended with the downfall of David ben Daniel in 1094.

Descendants of the house of exilarchs were living in various places long after the office became extinct. A descendant of Hezekiah, Hiyya al-Daudi, Gaon of Andalucia, died in 1154 in Castile according to Abraham ibn Daud. Several families, as late as the 14th century, traced their descent back to Josiah, the brother of David ben Zakkai who had been banished to Chorasan. The descendants of the Karaite exilarchs have been referred to above.

== Character of the exilarchate before Arab expansion ==
=== Relations with the Academies ===
In accordance with the character of Talmudic tradition, it is the relation of the exilarchs to the heads and members of the schools that is especially referred to in Talmudic literature. The Seder 'Olam Zuta, the chronicle of the exilarchs that is the most important and in many cases the only source of information concerning their succession, has also preserved chiefly the names of those scholars who had certain official relations with the respective exilarchs. The phrase used in this connection ("hakamim debaruhu", "the scholars directed him") is the stereotyped phrase used also in connection with the fictitious exilarchs of the century of the Second Temple; in the latter case, however, it occurs without the specific mention of names—a fact in favor of the historicalness of those names that are given for the succeeding centuries.

The authenticity of the names of the amoraim designated as the scholars "guiding" the several exilarchs, is, in the case of those passages in which the text is beyond dispute, supported by internal chronological evidence also. Some of the Babylonian amoraim were closely related to the house of the exilarchs, as, for example, Rabba ben Abuha, whom Gaon Sherira, claiming Davidian descent, named as his ancestor. Nahman ben Jacob (died 320) also became closely connected with the house of the exilarchs through his marriage with Rabba ben Abuha's daughter, the proud Yaltha; and he owed to this connection perhaps his office of chief judge of the Babylonian Jews. Huna, the head of the school of Sura, recognized Nahman ben Jacob's superior knowledge of the Law by saying that Nahman was very close to the "gate of the exilarch" ("baba di resh galuta"), where many cases were decided.

The term "dayyanei di baba" ("judges of the gate"), which was applied in the post-Talmudic time to the members of the court of the exilarch, is derived from the phrase just quoted. Two details of Nahman ben Jacob's life cast light on his position at the court of the exilarch: he received the two scholars Rav Chisda and Rabba b. Huna, who had come to pay their respects to the exilarch; and when the exilarch was building a new house he asked Nahman to take charge of the placing of the mezuzah according to the Law.

=== Behavior ===
The scholars who formed part of the retinue of the exilarch were called "scholars of the house of the exilarch" ("rabbanan di-be resh galuta"). A remark of Samuel, the head of the school of Nehardea, shows that they wore certain badges on their garments to indicate their position. Once a woman came to Nahman ben Jacob, complaining that the exilarch and the scholars of his court sat at the festival in a stolen booth, the material for it having been taken from her. There are many anecdotes of the annoyances and indignities the scholars had to suffer at the hands of the exilarchs' servants, such as the case of Amram the Pious, of Hiyya of Parwa, and of Abba ben Marta. The modification of ritual requirements granted to the exilarchs and their households in certain concrete cases is characteristic of their relation to the religious law. Once when certain preparations which the exilarch was making in his park for alleviating the strictness of the Sabbath law were interrupted by Raba and his pupils, he exclaimed, in the words of Jeremiah 4:22, "They are wise to do evil, but to do good they have no knowledge". There are frequent references to questions, partly halakhic and exegetical in nature, which the exilarch laid before his scholars. Details are sometimes given of lectures that were delivered "at the entrance to the house of the exilarch" These lectures were probably delivered at the time of the assemblies, which brought many representatives of Babylonian Judaism to the court of the exilarch after the autumnal festivals.

=== Etiquette of the Resh Galuta's court ===
The luxurious banquets at the court of the exilarch were well known. An old anecdote was repeated in the land of Israel concerning a splendid feast which the exilarch once gave to the tanna Judah ben Bathyra at Nisibis on the eve of Tisha Beav. though in the more exact S. Buber's edition, the feast was given by the chief of the synagogue. Another story told in the land of Israel relates that an exilarch had music in his house morning and evening, and that Mar 'Ukba, who subsequently became exilarch, sent him as a warning this verse from Hosea: "Rejoice not, O Israel, for joy, as other people."

The exilarch Nehemiah is said to have dressed entirely in silk. The Talmud says almost nothing in regard to the personal relations of the exilarchs to the royal court. One passage relates merely that Huna ben Nathan appeared before Yazdegerd I, who with his own hands girded him with the belt which was the sign of the exilarch's office. There are also two allusions dating from an earlier time, one by Hiyya, a Babylonian living in the land of Israel, and the other by Adda ben Ahaba, one of Rav's earlier pupils, from which it seems that the exilarch occupied a foremost position among the high dignitaries of the state when he appeared at the court first of the Arsacids, then of the Sassanids.

An Arabic writer of the 9th century records the fact that the exilarch presented a gift of 4,000 dirhems on the Persian feast of Nauruz. Regarding the functions of the exilarch as the chief tax-collector for the Jewish population, there is the curious statement, preserved only in the Jerusalem Talmud, that once, in the time of Huna, the head of the school of Sura, the exilarch was commanded to furnish as much grain as would fill a room of 40 square ells.

=== Juridical functions ===
The most important function of the exilarch was the appointment of the judge. Both Rav and Samuel said that the judge who did not wish to be held personally responsible in case of an error of judgment, would have to accept his appointment from the house of the exilarch. When Rav went from the land of Israel to Nehardea he was appointed overseer of the market by the exilarch. The exilarch had jurisdiction in criminal cases also. Aha b. Jacob, a contemporary of Rav, was commissioned by the exilarch to take charge of a murder case. The story found in Bava Kamma 59a is an interesting example of the police jurisdiction exercised by the followers of the exilarch in the time of Samuel. From the same time dates a curious dispute regarding the etiquette of precedence among the scholars greeting the exilarch. The exilarch had certain privileges regarding real property. It is a specially noteworthy fact that in certain cases the exilarch judged according to the Persian law; and it was the exilarch 'Ukba b. Nehemiah who communicated to the head of the school of Pumbedita, Rabbah ben Nahmai, three Persian statutes which Samuel recognized as binding.

A synagogal prerogative of the exilarch was mentioned in the land of Israel as a curiosity: The Torah roll was carried to the exilarch, while every one else had to go to the Torah to read from it. This prerogative is referred to also in the account of the installation of the exilarch in the Arabic period, and this gives color to the assumption that the ceremonies, as recounted in this document, were based in part on usages taken over from the Persian time. The account of the installation of the exilarch is supplemented by further details in regard to the exilarchate which are of great historical value; see the following section.

== Character of the exilarchate in the Arabic era ==
Upon their conquest of Iraq, the Caliphate confirmed the authority of exilarch on Bustanai son of Haninai, and the continuation of his governance over the Jewish community. For his political services to the Arab authorities during the Islamic conquests, he was given the daughter of the former Sassanid Emperor as a slave. Muslim authorities regarded the office of exilarch with profound respect as they viewed its incumbent as a direct descendant of the ancient prophet David. The subsequent fragmentation of the authority of the Abbasids resulted in the waning of the authority of the exilarch beyond the former Abbasid realm. Additionally, the struggle for leadership between the Geonim of the rabbinical academies and exilarchs saw the slow diminishment of centralized power. Rabbinical decentralization favored the Geonim, but remained an office of reverence to which Muslim authorities showed respect.

=== Installation ceremonies ===
The following is a translation of a portion of an account of the exilarchy in the Arabic period, written by Nathan ha-Babli in the early 10th century, and included in Abraham Zacuto's "Yuhasin" and in Neubauer's "Mediaeval Jewish Chronicles":

The members of the two academies [Sura and Pumbedita], led by the two heads [the geonim] as well as by the leaders of the community, assemble in the house of an especially prominent man before the Sabbath on which the installation of the exilarch is to take place. The first homage is paid on Thursday in the synagogue, the event being announced by trumpets, and every one sends presents to the exilarch according to his means. The leaders of the community and the wealthy send handsome garments, jewelry, and gold and silver vessels. On Thursday and Friday the exilarch gives great banquets. On the morning of the Sabbath the nobles of the community call for him and accompany him to the synagogue. Here a wooden platform covered entirely with costly cloth has been erected, under which a picked choir of sweet-voiced youths well versed in the liturgy has been placed. This choir responds to the leader in prayer, who begins the service with 'Baruk she-amar.' After the morning prayer the exilarch, who until now has been standing in a covered place, appears; the whole congregation rises and remains standing until he has taken his place on the platform, and the two geonim, the one from Sura preceding, have taken seats to his right and left, each making an obeisance.

A costly canopy has been erected over the seat of the exilarch. Then the leader in prayer steps in front of the platform and, in a low voice audible only to those close by, and accompanied by the 'Amen' of the choir, addresses the exilarch with a benediction, prepared long beforehand. Then the exilarch delivers a sermon on the text of the week or commissions the gaon of Sura to do so. After the discourse the leader in prayer recites the kaddish, and when he reaches the words 'during your life and in your days,' he adds the words 'and during the life of our prince, the exilarch.' After the kaddish he blesses the exilarch, the two heads of the schools, and the several provinces that contribute to the support of the academies, as well as the individuals who have been of especial service in this direction. Then the Torah is read. When the 'Kohen' and 'Levi' have finished reading, the leader in prayer carries the Torah roll to the exilarch, the whole congregation rising; the exilarch takes the roll in his hands and reads from it while standing. The two heads of the schools also rise, and the gaon of Sura recites the targum to the passage read by the exilarch. When the reading of the Torah is completed, a blessing is pronounced upon the exilarch. After the 'Musaf' prayer the exilarch leaves the synagogue, and all, singing, accompany him to his house. After that the exilarch rarely goes beyond the gate of his house, where services for the community are held on the Sabbaths and feastdays. When it becomes necessary for him to leave his house, he does so only in a carriage of state, accompanied by a large retinue. If the exilarch desires to pay his respects to the king, he first asks permission to do so. As he enters the palace the king's servants hasten to meet him, among whom he liberally distributes gold coin, for which provision has been made beforehand. When led before the king his seat is assigned to him. The king then asks what he desires. He begins with carefully prepared words of praise and blessing, reminds the king of the customs of his fathers, gains the favor of the king with appropriate words, and receives written consent to his demands; thereupon, rejoiced, he takes leave of the king.

=== Income and privileges ===
Regarding Nathan ha-Babli's additional account of the exilarch's income and functions (which refers, however, only to the time of the narrator), it may be noted that he collected taxes, amounting altogether to 700 gold denarii a year, chiefly from the provinces Nahrawan, Farsistan, and Holwan. The Muslim author of the 9th century, Al-Jahiz, who has been referred to above, makes special mention of the shofar, the wind-instrument which was used when the exilarch (ras al-jalut) excommunicated any one. The punishment of excommunication is the only ecclesiastical power the exilarch of the Jews and the Catholicos of the Christians may pronounce, for they are deprived of the right of inflicting punishment by imprisonment or flogging.

Another Muslim author reports a conversation that took place in the 8th century between a follower of Islam and the exilarch, in which the latter boasted; "Seventy generations have passed between me and King David, yet the Jews still recognize the prerogatives of my royal descent, and regard it as their duty to protect me; but you have slain the grandson Husain of your prophet after one single generation". The son of a previous exilarch said to yet another Muslim author: "I formerly never rode by Karbala, the place where Husain was martyred, without spurring on my horse, for an old tradition said that on this spot the descendant of a prophet would be killed; only since Husain has been slain there and the prophecy has thus been fulfilled do I pass leisurely by the place". This last story indicates that the exilarch had by the Arab period become the subject of Muslim legend. That the person of the exilarch was familiar to Muslim circles is also shown by the fact that the Rabbinite Jews were called Jaluti, that is, those belonging to the exilarch, in contradistinction to the Karaites. In the first quarter of the 11th century, not long before the extinction of the exilarchate, Ibn Hazm made the following remark in regard to the dignity: "The ras al-jalut has no power whatever over the Jews or over other persons; he has merely a title, to which is attached neither authority nor prerogatives of any kind".

To this day, the exilarchs are still mentioned in the Sabbath services of the Ashkenazi ritual. The Aramaic prayer "Yekum Purkan", which was used once in Babylon in pronouncing the blessing upon the leaders there, including the "reshe galwata" (the exilarchs), is still recited in most synagogues. The Jews of the Sephardic ritual have not preserved this anachronism, nor was it retained in most of the Reform synagogues.

== See also ==
- Abravanel family
- Babylonian captivity
- Benveniste family
- Dayan family
- Nehardea
