= Yahia Ben Rabbi =

Portuguese nobleman (c.1145 – 1222)

Yahia Ben Rabbi (c.1145 – 1222) (pronounced YAH-hee-yah) was a Portuguese nobleman. He was reputed to be a direct descendant of the Hebrew exilarchs of ancient Babylonia (Iraq) that claimed direct descent from the Biblical King David and was the eponymous progenitor of the Ibn Yahya family.

Ben Rabbi was the son of Yaish Ibn Yahya (born between 1120 and 1130, died 1196) and grandson of Hiyya al-Daudi (born between 1080 and 1090, died 1154), who was a prominent rabbi, composer, and poet and served as advisor to Afonso II of Portugal. He was also said to be the son of Châmoa Gomes de Pombeiro, though there is little evidence to support this. Ben Rabbi was also known as Yahia o Negro (Yahia "the Black" in Portuguese), it being a cognomen he inherited from his father, who himself gained it from being made Lord of the town of Aldeia dos Negros, near Óbidos.

Ben Rabbi had five sons with his wife:

- Yaish Ben (Ibn) Yahya, the father of three sons, Yosef (Jucef), Shlomo (fl. 1255), and Moshe (died 1279).
- Yakov Ben Yahya, the father of Hiyya, the father of Eli
- Yosef Ben (Ibn) Yahya (born c. 1210, died 1264), the father of Shlomo Ha-Zaken (died 1299), the father of three sons, who were: Yosef (Jucef), Gedaliah (the father of David, Dan(iel) Ha-Rav and Yonah, called Paloma in Spanish, mistress of Fadrique Alfonso, Lord of Haro), and Hiyya
- Yehuda (Judah) "Sar" Ben Yahya, father of Yahya (father of Yakov, father of Hiyya) and Yosef
- Yahia Ben Yahi, father of Shlomo, Joseph, and Bakr Ben Yahya
