= Yaish Ibn Yahya =

Yaish Ibn Yahya (born c. 1120 or 1130, died 1196). Son of Hiyya al-Daudi and the father of Yahia Ben Rabbi. Resident of Lisbon, Portugal; scholar, politician, vast land holdings; advisor to king Afonso I of Portugal.

Yaish ibn Yahya, was a military leader for an Andalusian Muslim leader in Morocco, then for king Afonso I of Portugal, who made him Lord of Unhos Freitas Aldeia dos Negros: Yachya ibn Yachya.

Before 1147, there were several settlements between Leiria and Lisbon. Where Yaish lived, in Lisbon, was a large nucleus of Jews, with synagogues and infrastructure to support Jewish life. Dom Afonso I appointed Yaish, who was Jewish, as steward and knight-mor (of the Order of Saint James of the Sword), was rewarded for services rendered in the fight against the Muslims, and granted the Village of Blacks. (A dos Negros); this donation refers to the taking of Óbidos (near Aldeia dos Negros) in 1148. After claiming his land, Yaish Flourished and died in 1196. In honor of his reward, Yaish and his descendants bore the additional cognomen, "Negro". In the Register of Population of the Kingdom, made by King João III of Portugal, in 1527, the Village of Blacks had about 90 inhabitants.

The Synagogue of Óbidos is located in the old Jewish Quarter and dates to the 7th-century C.E where a Jewish community was re-established after the Visigoths seized the village in the 5th century. Óbidos was taken in 1148, by the Jewish vizier, Yaish ibn Yahya; in return for its liberation, King Afonso Henriques I rewarded Yaish ibn Yahya with a nearby town and anointed him "Lord of Unhos, Frielas and Aldeia dos Negros".
