= Mar Zutra =

Babylonian rabbi (died 417)

Mar Zutra (Hebrew: מר זוטרא, died 417 CE) was a Babylonian rabbi, of the sixth generation of amoraim.

== Biography ==
He was a student of Rav Papa, whom he frequently quoted, and Rav Papi.

His closest colleagues were Rav Ashi and Amemar. The three of them are described together in their studies, meals, and visits to the court of Yazdegerd I.

He headed the Yeshiva of Pumbedita, and according to the book "Seder Tannaim ve-Amoraim", previous to Rav Aha b. Rava. In the Iggeret Rav Sherira Gaon (French version), he is not mentioned as a head of a Yeshiva, but in later sources he is noted as Mar Zutra, Head of a Yeshiva.
