= Hiyya al-Daudi =

Hiyya al-Daudi (born circa 1085 in Babylonia, died Kingdom of Castile, 1154) (Hebrew: חייא אלדאודי) was a prominent rabbi, composer, and poet of Andalusia. His hymns are still used in Sephardic congregations throughout the world.

Hiyya al-Daudi was the son of David, son of Hezekiah Gaon. He emigrated from Babylonia to the Iberian Peninsula, according to the historian Abraham Zacuto. He was an outstanding rabbi, liturgical composer, and poet, and he served as Advisor to King Afonso I of Portugal. He was "accorded the title Chiya Rishon L’Galil Portugal (Chiya, First in the Land of Portugal)" Two of his piyutim (poems) were included in the compilation, Betulat bat Yehudah by the scholar Samuel David Luzzatto.

His son, Yaish Ibn Yahya (died 1196), was the father of Yahia Ben Rabbi.

Hiyya al-Daudi was educated at Yeshivat Ge'on Ya'aqov (Academy of the Pride of Jacob, the Palestine Yeshiva); he was a skilled mathematician who was especially adept at geometry.

Hiyya al-Daudi was the beneficiary of extensive grants of land in the vicinity of Lerida with permission to rent them to whomever he desired, Christian, Jew, or Muslim. He also owned wine cellars in the Jewish citadel of Lerida. He is the first Jew to be designated in official documents as "bailiff' or "Almoxarife".

Lerida and Monzon are close to Saragossa. Also in Aragon, southwest of Saragossa in the city of Calatayud, was the magnificent Ibn Yahya synagogue, built by Aharon Ibn Yahya, "besides two other chapels of prayer and study that bore the names of their founders." Calatayud is translated as "Castle or fortress of the Jews". By the kings of Aragon, the Jews of Calatayud were granted certain privileges, including one that pertained to oath-taking; such privileges were from time to time renewed.

Hiyya was administrator of Templar Lands in Castile-León, Spain. He is buried in a cemetery there, just outside the walls of the Templar Castle.

He fulfilled an important function in the apportionment of conquered territory on behalf of King Alfonso I "The Battler" (1073–1134) of Aragon and Navarre. Rabbi Hiyya was instrumental in conquering the Taifa of Zaragoza (which included Lerida and Zaragoza and Monzon) from the Arab dynasty named Banu Hud, whose ruler was Al-Mustain I, Sulayman ibn Hud al-Judhami.

Note Hiyya is also spelled Chiya. The name stands for Chaim (Hebrew for Life חיים).

== Sources ==
- Ibn Daud, Abraham: Seffer Hakabbala (in Hebrew), Oxford, 1887, page 67.
- Zacuto, Abraham: The book of Lineage, Zacuto Foundation, Tel Aviv, 2005, pp 515 and 534.
