= Jehoshaphat (High Priest) =

High Priest of Israel

According to Seder Olam Zuta, Jehoshaphat (Hebrew: יְהוֹשָׁפָט Yəhōšāp̄āṭ, "Yahweh has judged") was a High Priest of Israel, succeeding Jehoiarib and succeeded by Jehoiada.

However, the historian Josephus does not mention a Jehoshaphat, and according to his account, the second High Priest after Joram (the chronological place of Jehoshaphat) was Pediah. Nor is a high priest named Jehoshaphat mentioned in the list of the Zadokite dynasty in 1 Chronicles 5:30–40 (6:4-15 in some translations) or elsewhere in the Tanakh.

Israelite religious titles
Preceded by Jehoiarib (According to the Seder 'Olam Zutta)	High Priest of Israel	Succeeded by Jehoiada (According to the Seder 'Olam Zutta)
