= Ahijah =

Ahijah (Hebrew: אֲחִיָּה ʾĂḥīyyā, "brother of Yah"; Latin and Douay–Rheims: Ahias) is a name of several biblical individuals:

1. Ahijah the Shilonite, the Biblical prophet who divided the Kingdoms of Israel and Judah.
2. One of the sons of Bela (1 Chr. 8:7, RV). In AV (KJV) called "Ahiah."
3. One of the five sons of Jerahmeel, who was great-grandson of Judah (1 Chr. 2:25).
4. A Pelonite, one of David's heroes (1 Chr. 11:36); called also Eliam (2 Sam. 23:34).
5. A Levite having charge of the sacred treasury in the temple (1 Chr. 26:20).
6. One of Solomon's secretaries (1 Kings 4:3).
7. Son of Ahitub (1 Sam. 14:3, 18), Ichabod's brother; the same probably as Ahimelech, who was High Priest at Nob in the reign of Saul (1 Sam. 22:11) and at Shiloh, where the Tabernacle was set up. Some, however, suppose that Ahimelech was the brother of Ahijah, and that they both officiated as high priests, Ahijah at Gibeah or Kirjath-jearim, and Ahimelech at Nob.
8. Father of King Baasha of Israel

A man named Ahijah also appears in the Babylonian Talmud in the 2nd century AD as one of the first Babylonian Exilarchs.

== Sources ==
Israelite religious titles
Preceded by Ahitub	High Priest of Israel	Succeeded by Ahimelech
