= Ahitub =

Ahitub (Hebrew: אֲחִיטוּב ’Aḥiṭub or ’Aḥiṭuv 'my brother is goodness') may refer to the following people in the Bible:

- Ahitub (High Priest), High Priests of Israel, son of Phinehas, grandson of Eli
- Ahitub, father of Zadok, grandson of Meraioth
- Ahitub, grandson of Azariah, a priestly descendant through the priestly line of the first Zadok, mentioned in 1 Chronicles 6:11-12. this Ahitub also had a son (or probably grandson) by the name of Zadok. This Ahitub may have been high priest in the later time of the kings, but he also may not have been a high priest. He did become the ancestor of later high priests, which served during the fall of Jerusalem and post-exile.
- Ahitub, an ancestor of a person mentioned in Nehemiah 11:11. This person might be one of the three aforementioned persons, but probably is not.
