= Battle of Aphek =

Biblical Israelite-Philistine battle

- Part of Philistine-Israelite wars
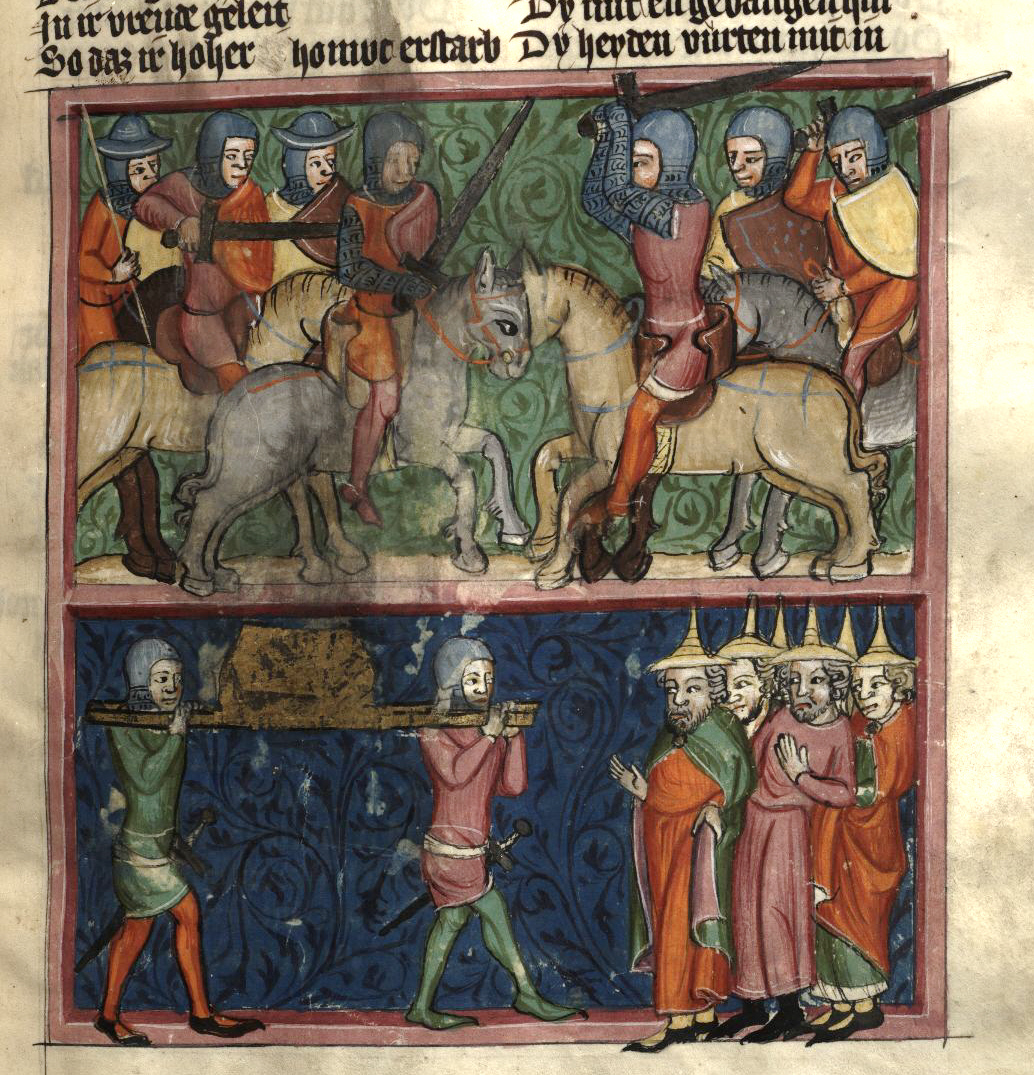
- The battle depicted in Rudolf von Ems' Weltchronik
Location
Result
Aphek, Canaan
- Philistine victory
- Captivity of the Ark

Belligerents
| Israelites | Philistines |

Commanders and leaders
| Hophni †; Phinehas † (on behalf of judge Eli) | unknown |

Strength
| Unknown | Unknown |

Casualties and losses
| 34,000 | Light |

The Battle of Aphek is a biblical episode described in the First Book of Samuel 4:1–10 of the Hebrew Bible. During this battle the Philistines defeated the Israelite army and captured the Ark of the Covenant. Among biblical scholars, the historicity of the early events in the Books of Samuel is debated, with some scholars leaning toward many events in Samuel being historical, and some scholars leaning towards less. (See also Biblical minimalism and Biblical maximalism.)

== Biblical account ==
The Book of Samuel records that the Philistines were camped at Aphek and the Israelites at Eben-Ezer. The Philistines defeated the Israelites during the first battle, killing 4,000 Israelites. The Israelites then brought up the Ark of the Covenant from Shiloh, thinking that through this "they should have the presence of God with them, and so success", but the Philistines again defeated the Israelites, this time killing 30,000 and capturing the Ark.

Samuel records that the two sons of the judge Eli, Hophni and Phinehas, died that day, as well as Eli. "And it came to pass, when [a messenger] made mention of the ark of God, that [Eli] fell from off his seat backward by the side of the gate, and his neck broke, and he died; for he was an old man, and heavy. And he had judged Israel forty years." (1 Samuel 4:18)

== Place ==
Most scholars agree that there were more than one Aphek. C. R. Conder identified the Aphek of Eben-Ezer with a ruin (Khirbet) some 3.7 miles (6 km) distant from Dayr Aban (believed to be Eben-Ezer), and known by the name Marj al-Fikiya; the name al-Fikiya being an Arabic corruption of Aphek. Eusebius, when writing about Eben-ezer in his Onomasticon, says that it is "the place from which the Gentiles seized the Ark, between Jerusalem and Ascalon, near the village of Bethsamys (Beit Shemesh)", a locale that corresponds with Conder's identification.

== See also ==
- List of battles between Israel and the Philistines
