= Philistine captivity of the Ark =

Episode in biblical history

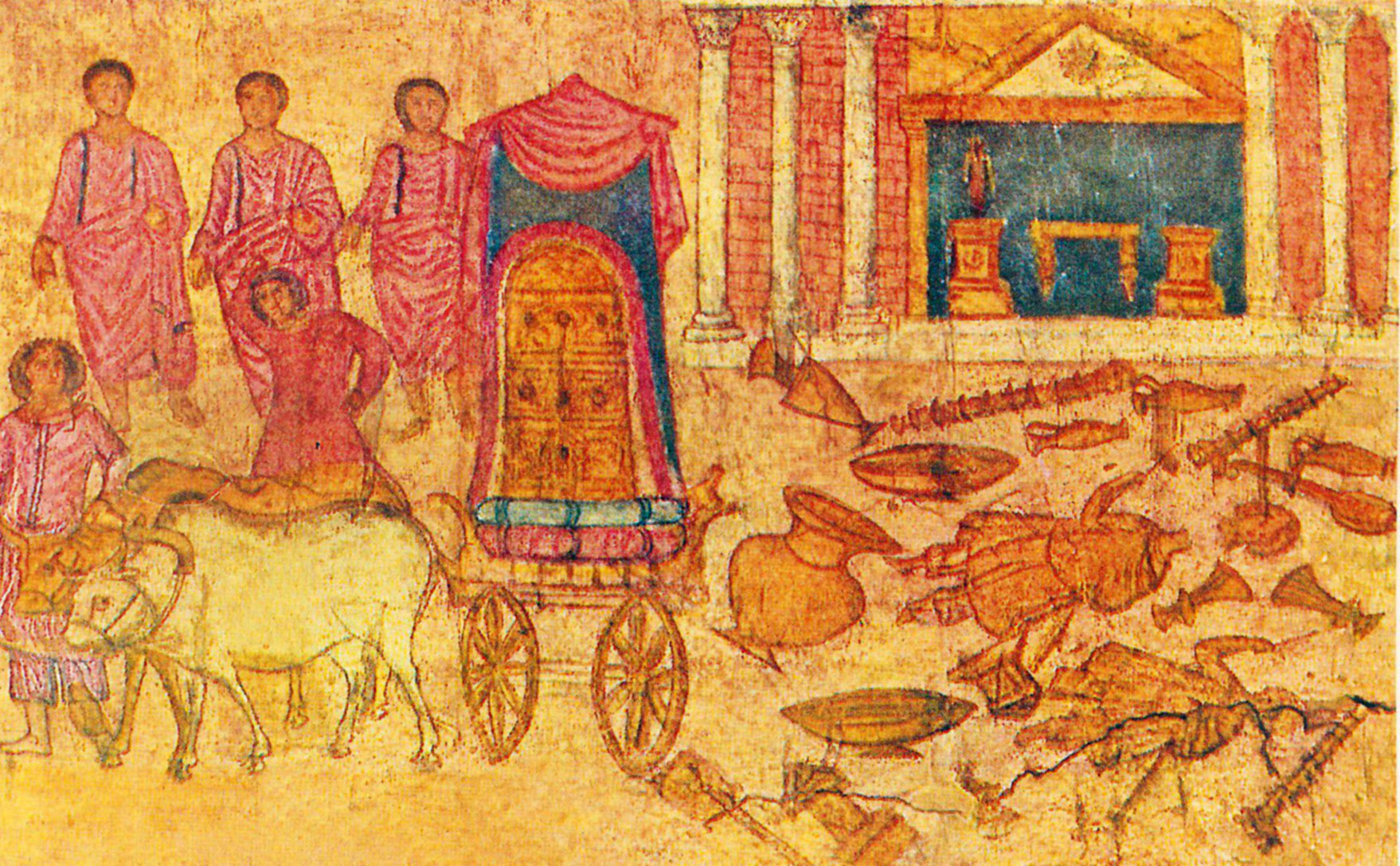
Fresco of the Philistine captivity of the Ark, in the Dura-Europos synagogue.

The Philistine captivity of the Ark was an episode described in the biblical history of the Israelites, in which the Ark of the Covenant was in the possession of the Philistines, who had captured it after defeating the Israelites in the Battle of Aphek. The battle took place between Eben-ezer, where the Israelites encamped, and Aphek (probably Antipatris), where the Philistines encamped.

The ark narrative does not include any mention of Samuel; Bill T. Arnold suggests that it is "in order to celebrate the power of Yahweh's ark." Many scholars put 1 Samuel 4 - 6 together with 2 Samuel 6 and believe that it reflects an old source that was eventually incorporated into the History of David's Rise or into the later Deuteronomistic History.

According to 1 Samuel 4, prior to the battle, the Ark had been residing at the ancient sanctuary of Shiloh, but was brought out by the Israelites in hope of victory in the war. The Israelites suffered a significant defeat; Hophni and Phinehas, sons of the High Priest Eli, were killed and the ark was captured. The news of the ark's capture was such a shock to Eli that he fell off his chair and died, while Phinehas' wife died in childbirth as she heard the news, giving birth to Ichabod, whose name means "Where is the glory?" Robert Alter argues that 1 Samuel 4:22 should be translated as "Glory is exiled from Israel," and that the story of the Philistine captivity of the ark is one of exile. Peter Leithart suggests that Israel deserved to go into exile, but the ark did so instead: "Yahweh went into exile, taking on the curse of the covenant for His people, and while in exile He fought for them and defeated the gods of Philistia."

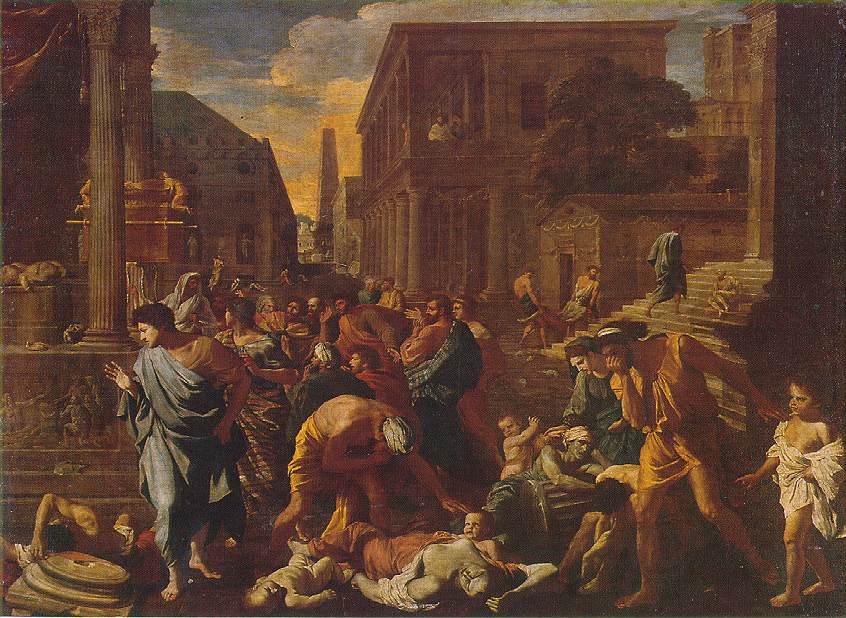
Nicolas Poussin, The Plague of Ashdod.

1 Samuel 5 and 6 describe the Philistines as having to move the Ark to several parts of their territory, as tumours or hemorrhoids ("emerods") afflicted the people in each town to which it was taken: Ashdod, then Gath, then Ekron. The Septuagint adds that "mice sprang up in the midst of their country". Other translations use the words "rats" or "rodents" and recent research suggests this may have been the bubonic plague. Stirrup points out that the "severity of the punishments increases through the passage": tumours in Ashdod (vv. 6–8), extensive tumours and panic in Gath, which had volunteered to take on the Ark (vv. 9,10a), and tumours on those who did not die and deathly panic in Ekron, which was 'volunteered' to take the Ark (vv. 10b-12). The text explicitly ascribes the plague to "Yahweh's hand" (1 Samuel 5:6).

In Ashdod, when the Ark was placed in the temple of Dagon, the statue of Dagon was found prostrate in front of the Ark the next morning; after the statue of Dagon was restored to its place, it was again found prostrate the next morning, and this time its head and hands had also been broken off.

Leithart provides a number of parallels between the Philistine captivity of the Ark and the Plagues of Egypt in the Book of Exodus. The ark brings about plagues, humbles the gods of the Philistines and returns full of treasure. In fact, the Philistine diviners refer to the events of the Exodus in 1 Samuel 6:6. On the advice of these diviners about how to end the plagues, the Philistines made a guilt offering of five golden tumors and five gold mice (representing the five Philistine rulers). They then placed the gold along with the ark on a cart drawn by two milch cows, who head straight for Israel and do not waver. The ark stops at Beth Shemesh before finding a more permanent home at Kiriath-Jearim.
