= Zedekiah (High Priest) =

Zedekiah (Hebrew: צִדְקִיָּהוּ, romanized: Ṣiḏqîyāhū, "Yah is righteousness") was the High Priest of Solomon's Temple that succeeded Pediah. According to Josephus Zedekiah (Sudeas) was the son of Pediah (Phideas). He also appears in the High Priest list of the medieval chronicle Seder 'Olam Zuta. Zedekiah is never mentioned in the Bible, his name does not appear in the Zadokite genealogy given in 1 Chr. 5:30–40 (6:4–15 in other translations).

== Patrilineal ancestry ==
as per 1 Chronicles 27 (up to Jehoiada) and then Josephus

Patrilineal descent
1. Abraham
2. Isaac
3. Jacob
4. Levi
5. Kohath
6. Amram
7. Aaron
8. Eleazar
9. Phinehas
10. Abishua
11. Bukki
12. Uzzi
13. Zerahiah
14. Meraioth
15. Amariah
16. Ahitub
17. Zadok
18. Achim
19. Eliud
20. Benaiah
21. Jehoiada
22. Pediah

Israelite religious titles
Preceded by Pediah (According to the Seder 'Olam Zutta)	High Priest of Israel	Succeeded by Joel
