= Johanan (exilarch) =

2nd century AD Jewish leader in Mesopotamia

Johanan was a Jewish exilarch of the 2nd century AD who succeeded his brother Nahum, according to the Seder Olam Zutta. He is either the son or a descendant of Akkub, although more likely, he is the son of Ahijah. The date of his tenure is disputed.

Regnal titles
Preceded by Nahum	3rd Babylonian Exilarch abt. 170	Succeeded by Shaphat
