= Phinehas's wife =

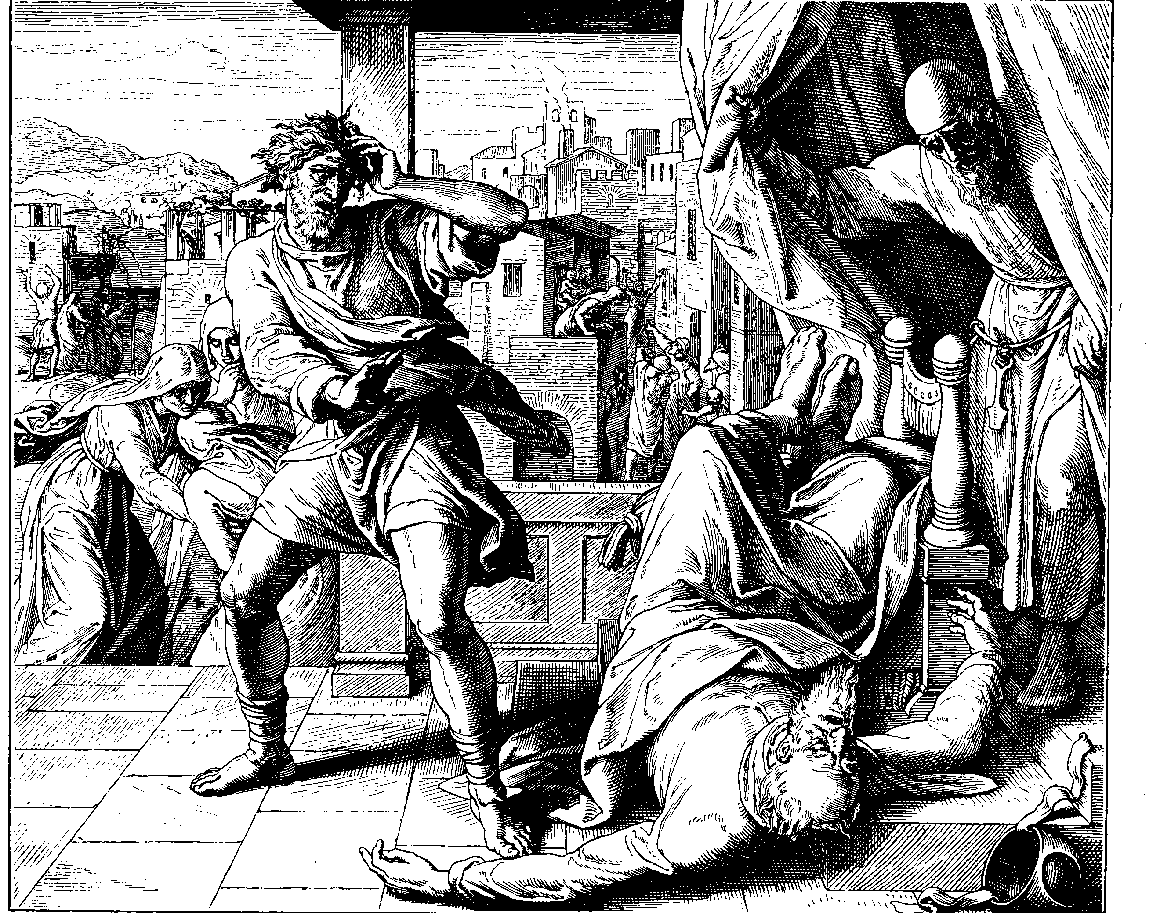
"The Death of Eli" by Julius Schnorr von Carolsfeld, from Die Bibel in Bildern, 1860. The wife of Phinehas is portrayed giving birth in the left of the picture.

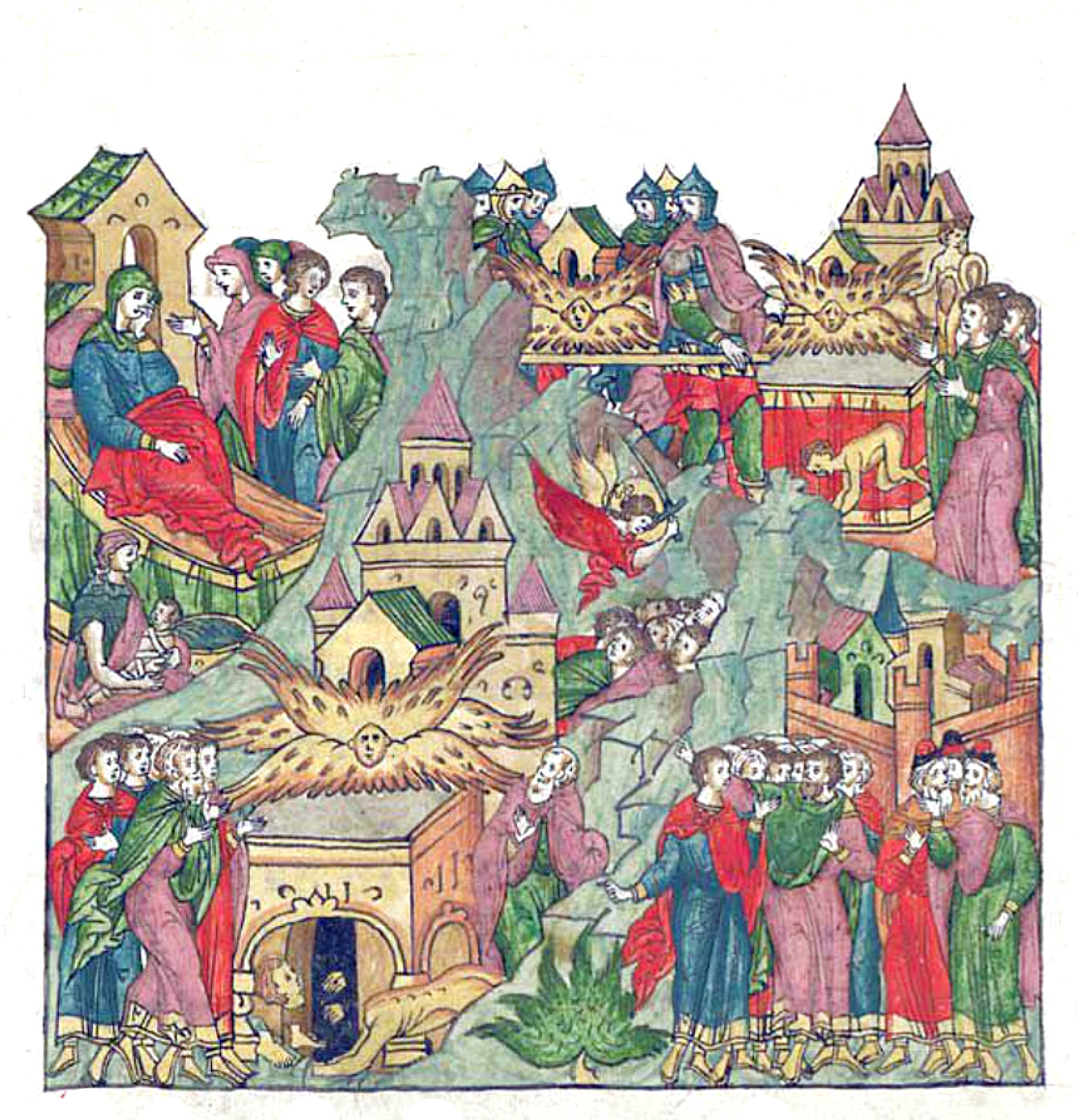
Birth of Ichabod. The fall of the statue of Dagon near the Ark captured by the Philistines

The wife of Phinehas is an unnamed character in the Hebrew Bible. Her story covers just a few verses at the end of 1 Samuel 4, where she is introduced as the daughter-in-law of Eli and the wife of Phinehas. She prematurely goes into labor after she hears that Phinehas and Eli have died and the Ark of God had been captured by the Philistines. She dies in childbirth, and calls her son "Ichabod", saying, "The glory has departed from Israel."

Susan Pigott notes that it is this woman (rather than Eli or Samuel), who "voices the dismay all Israel feels" when the ark is captured. Robert Alter suggests that the loss of the Ark "affects her much more than her husband's demise". Yairah Amit disagrees, however, and argues that the weightiest event from this woman's viewpoint is the death of her husband, but that a later editor or editors "sought to show the woman as caring more about the ark than about her own fate, and put in her mouth a national-religious name etymology."
