= Elides =

Elides may refer to

- The action of elision, omitting one or more sounds, in linguistics
- The descendants of Eli the priest in the Hebrew Bible
