= Matthias Ephlias =

Jewish priest

Matthias I Ephlias (Greek: Ματθίας ό Ήφλίον, Ήφλίον Ephlias was his Greek epithet, flourished in the second half of the 2nd century BC and the first half of the 1st century BC) was an ethnic Jew living in Jerusalem.

The meaning of Matthias' epithet is obscure. His epithet could mean ‘Handsome’ from the Hebrew language or ‘son of Ephesus’ from the Greek language, as he was sometimes known as ‘Matthias of Ephesus’. For Matthias to obtain his epithet, it reveals he may have been a distinguished Jew.

Matthias was one of the nine children born to Simon Psellus. Matthias came from a wealthy family of priestly descent. His father served as a priest in the Temple in Jerusalem. Through his father, Matthias belonged to the priestly order of the Jehoiarib, which was the first of the twenty-four orders of priests in the Temple in Jerusalem.

Matthias became a priest serving in the Temple in Jerusalem and married the daughter of High Priest Jonathon. There is a possibility that Jonathon may have been Alexander Jannaeus, the High Priest and Hasmonean ruler who governed Judea from 103 BC to 76 BC who was the second husband of Salome Alexandra. Alexander Jannaeus was also known as Jonathon. (Flavius josephus Life story has Johnathan the oldest son of Asmoneus "Hasmonian" which simon, his father was the first to be Hyrcanus. "Johnathan Hyrcanus I...")

His unnamed Jewish wife bore him a son, Matthias Curtus. Through his son, Matthias was an ancestor of the Roman Jewish historian of the 1st century, Flavius Josephus.

== Sources ==
- M. Fergus, S. Emil & V. Geza, The History of the Jewish People in the Age of Jesus Christ (175 B.C. - A.D. 135), Continuum International Publishing Group, 1973
- Reader's Digest: Jesus and His Times, The Reader's Digest Association, Inc. Printed by Fourth Printing USA, July 1990
- F. Josephus & S. Mason, Flavius Josephus: translation and commentary, BRILL, 2001
