= Ichabod =

Biblical figure

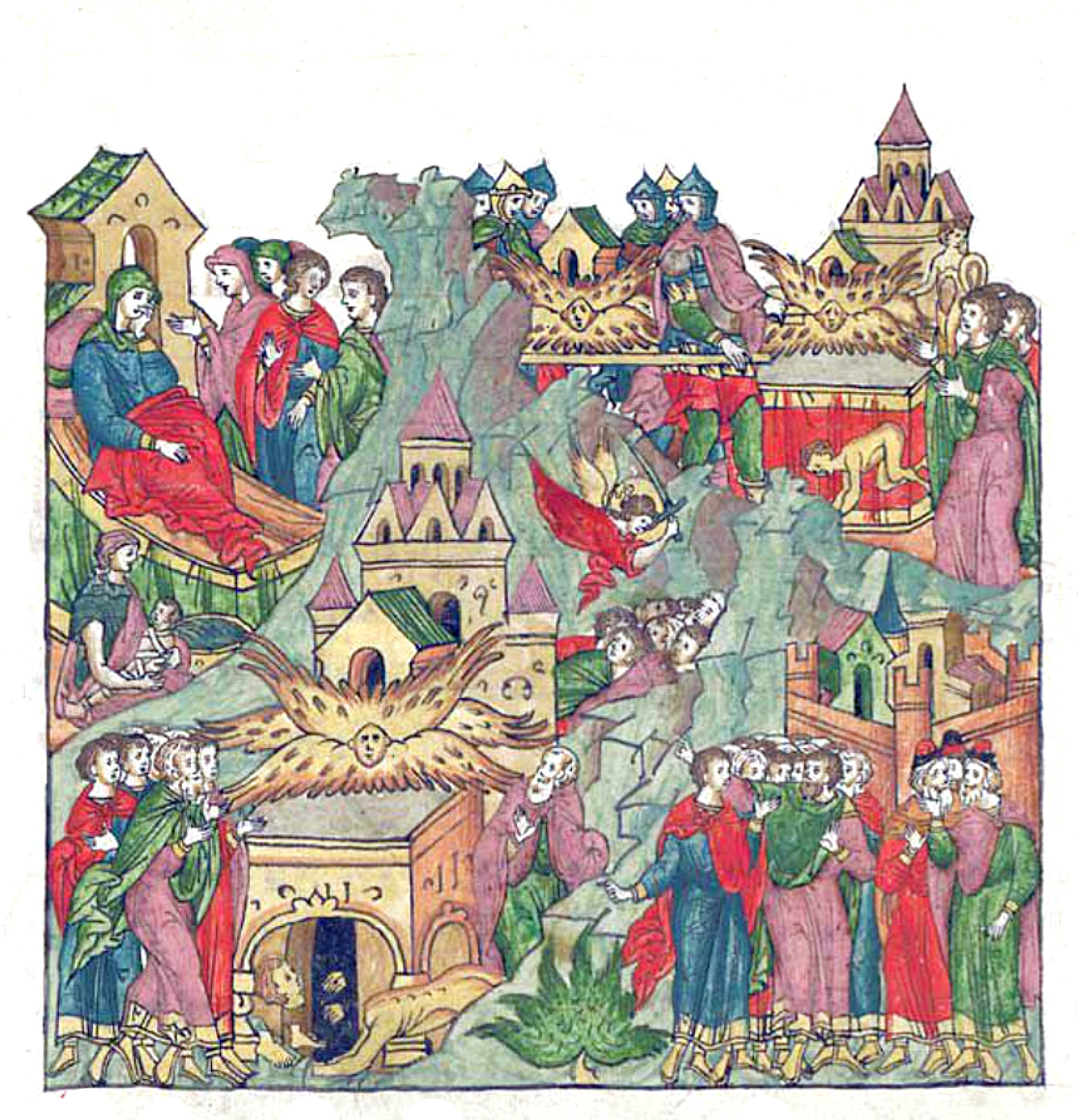
Birth of Ichabod. The fall of the statue of Dagon near the Ark captured by the Philistines

Ichabod (Hebrew: אִיכָבוֹד ʾĪḵāḇōḏ, "without glory", or "where is the glory?"; Septuagint: Οὐαὶ βαρχαβώθ) is mentioned in the first Book of Samuel as the son of Phinehas, a priest at the biblical shrine of Shiloh. Ichabod was born immediately after the Philistines captured the Israelites' Ark of the Covenant: Ichabod's mother went into labour due to the shock of hearing that her husband and Eli, her father-in-law, had died and that the Ark had fallen into enemy hands. 1 Samuel 14:3 names Ichabod as the brother of Ahitub.

== Etymology ==
The First Book of Samuel (4:21–22) tells how Ichabod's mother named him because the glory has departed from Israel, because of the loss of the Ark to the Philistines, and perhaps also because of the deaths of Eli and Phinehas. She repeats the phrase "The glory has departed from Israel, for the ark of God has been captured", to show her piety, and to express that the public and spiritual loss lay heavier upon her spirit than her personal or domestic calamity. Yairah Amit suggests that his name indicates "the fate of this newborn child who would have no parents, no grandfather and not even God, because even the glory has departed from the place".

Biblical commentator Donald Spence Jones states that

the meaning of the term I-chabod is much disputed, owing to the doubt which hangs over the first syllable, "I", followed by "chabod". It is usually taken to mean a simple negative: "not": chabod signifying "glory", I-chabod thus represents "not glory", i.e., there is no glory. Others render the "I" syllable as a rhetorical question, "Where?", "Where is the glory?", the answer, of course, being, "It is nowhere". But the best rendering seems to be to understand the syllable "I" as an exclamation of bitter sorrow, "Alas!": the name then could be translated, "Alas! the glory."

The Septuagint states that Ichabod's name was a complaint: Uaebarchaboth, woe to the glory of Israel. The Codex Vaticanus Graecus 1209 also refers to Ichabod as ouai barchaboth, i.e. as I Bar Chabod - I, son of Chabod or No, son of Glory. According to textual scholars, this section of the Book of Samuel, the sanctuaries source, derives from a fairly late source compared with other parts, and hence this justification of his name may simply represent a folk etymology.

While the Hebrew Bible barely mentions Ichabod, the fact that Ahitub is elsewhere referred to as the brother of Ichabod, rather than as son of Phinehas (or of anyone else), has led textual scholars to suspect that Ichabod was considered a significant individual in the time of Samuel (11th century BCE).
