= Pediah =

Pediah (Hebrew: פְּדָיָה Pəḏāyā, "Yah has ransomed") was the High Priest of Solomon's Temple. Josephus wrote that after Axioramos (maybe Jehoiada) his son 'Phideas' became the new High Priest. Pediah doesn't appear in the High Priest family line of 1 Chr. 5:30–40 (6:4-15 in other translations), at his chronological position (sixth after Zadok) the name 'Ahitub' appears.

== Patrilineal ancestry ==
as per 1 Chronicles 27 (up to Jehoiada) and then Josephus

Patrilineal descent
1. Abraham
2. Isaac
3. Jacob
4. Levi
5. Kohath
6. Amram
7. Aaron
8. Eleazar
9. Phinehas
10. Abishua
11. Bukki
12. Uzzi
13. Zerahiah
14. Meraioth
15. Amariah
16. Ahitub
17. Zadok
18. Achim
19. Eliud
20. Benaiah
21. Jehoiada

Israelite religious titles
Preceded by Jehoiada (According to the Seder 'Olam Zutta)	High Priest of Israel	Succeeded by Zedekiah (According to the Seder 'Olam Zutta)
