= Nahum (exilarch) =

2nd century AD Jewish leader in Mesopotamia

Nahum, or Nehunyon, was a Jewish exilarch of the 2nd century AD, according to the Seder Olam Zutta, residing within the Parthian Empire. He is believed to be one of the oldest identifiable members of the house of the exilarch in Babylonia, as no explicit mention of one is noted before his tenure. Very little is known about him or the nature of the office that he served during his lifetime. He was allegedly succeeded as exilarch by his brother Johanan.

Regnal titles
Preceded by Ahijah	2nd Babylonian Exilarch abt. 140	Succeeded by Johanan
