= Joash (High Priest) =

High Priest of Israel

Joash (Hebrew: יוֹאָשׁ Yō’āš, "Yah is strong") was the fourth High Priest of Solomon's Temple. Josephus wrote that after Azariah his son 'Joram' became the new High Priest. The third name in the High Priest family line of 1 Chr. 5:30–40 (6:4-15 in other translations) is 'Johanan'.

Patrilineal descent
1. Abraham
2. Isaac
3. Jacob
4. Levi
5. Kohath
6. Amram
7. Aaron
8. Eleazar
9. Phinehas
10. Abishua
11. Bukki
12. Uzzi
13. Zerahiah
14. Meraioth
15. Amariah
16. Ahitub
17. Zadok
18. Ahimaaz
19. Azariah

Israelite religious titles
Preceded by Azariah (According to the Seder 'Olam Zutta)	High Priest of Israel	Succeeded by Jehoiarib (According to the Seder 'Olam Zutta)
