= Hazub =

Rab Hazub was the last member of the Davidic Dynasty mentioned in the Seder Olam Zutta. He was the son of Rab Phinehas. He was overthrown by Fatimid caliph Al-Muizz Lideenillah, who captured Jerusalem in 969.
