= Hophni and Phinehas =

Two sons of the High Priest Eli

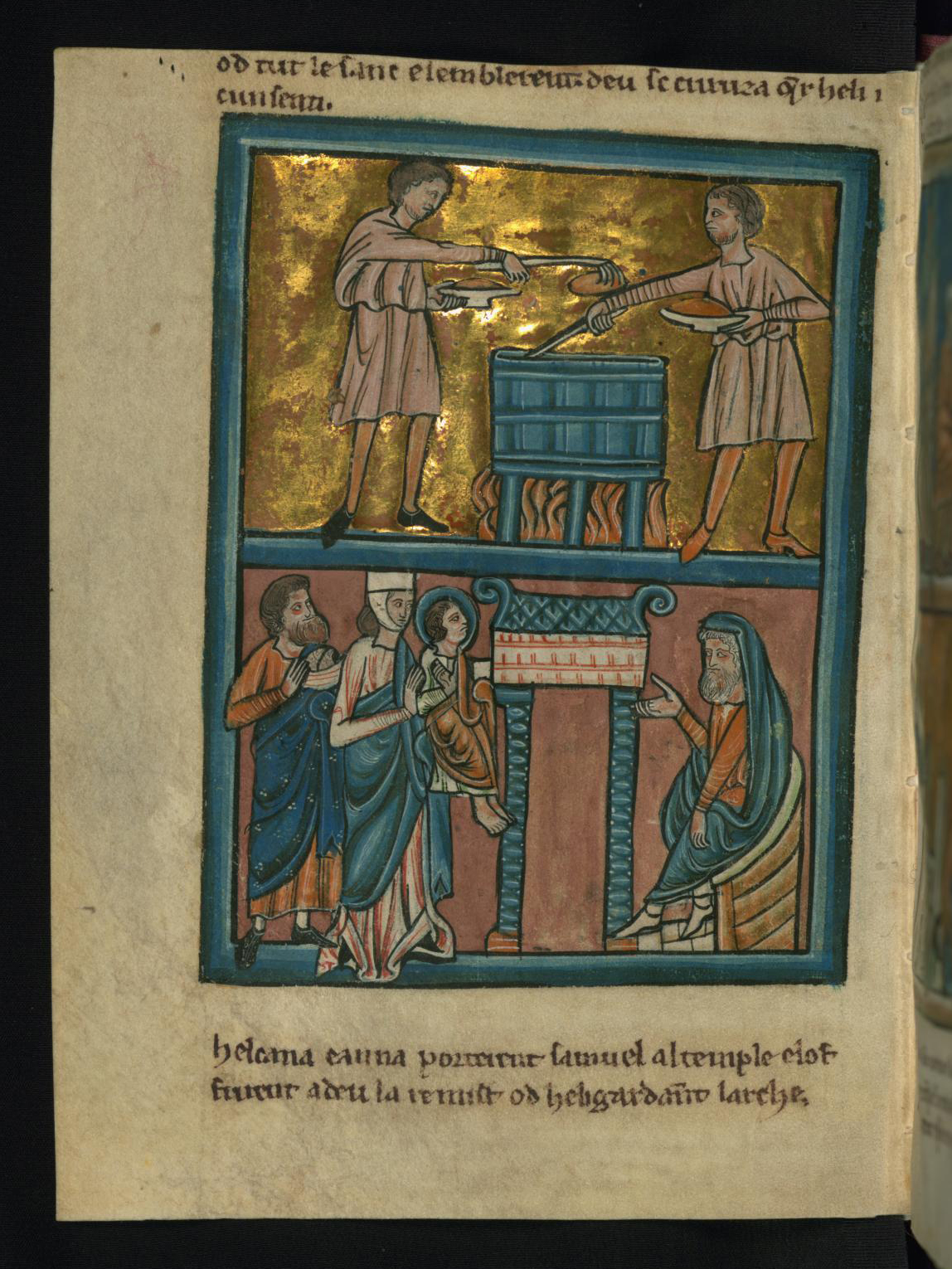
Depiction by William de Brailes.

Hophni (Hebrew: חָפְנִי, Modern: Ḥofnī, Tiberian: Ḥop̄nī "My Handful" and Phinehas or Phineas (Hebrew: פִּינְחָס, Modern: Pīnḥas, Tiberian: Pīnəḥās, "the bronze-colored one".) were the two sons of Eli. The first book of Samuel describes them as the officiating priests at the sanctuary of Shiloh at the time of Hannah. According to Josephus, Phinehas officiated as high priest because Eli had resigned as high priest at Shiloh because of his advanced age.

In the biblical narrative, Hophni and Phinehas are criticised for engaging in illicit behaviour, such as appropriating the best portion of sacrifices for themselves, and having sexual relations with the sanctuary's serving women. They are described as "sons of Belial" in (1 Samuel 2:12) KJV, "corrupt" in the New King James Version, or "scoundrels" in the NIV. Their misdeeds provoked the wrath of Yahweh and led to a divine curse being put on the house of Eli, and they subsequently both died on the same day, when Israel was defeated by the Philistines at the Battle of Aphek near Eben-ezer; the news of this defeat then led to Eli's death (1 Samuel 4:17–18). On hearing of the deaths of Eli and Phinehas, and of the capture of the ark, Phinehas' wife gave birth to a son whom she named Ichabod (expressing 'departed glory') before she herself died (1 Samuel 4:19–22).

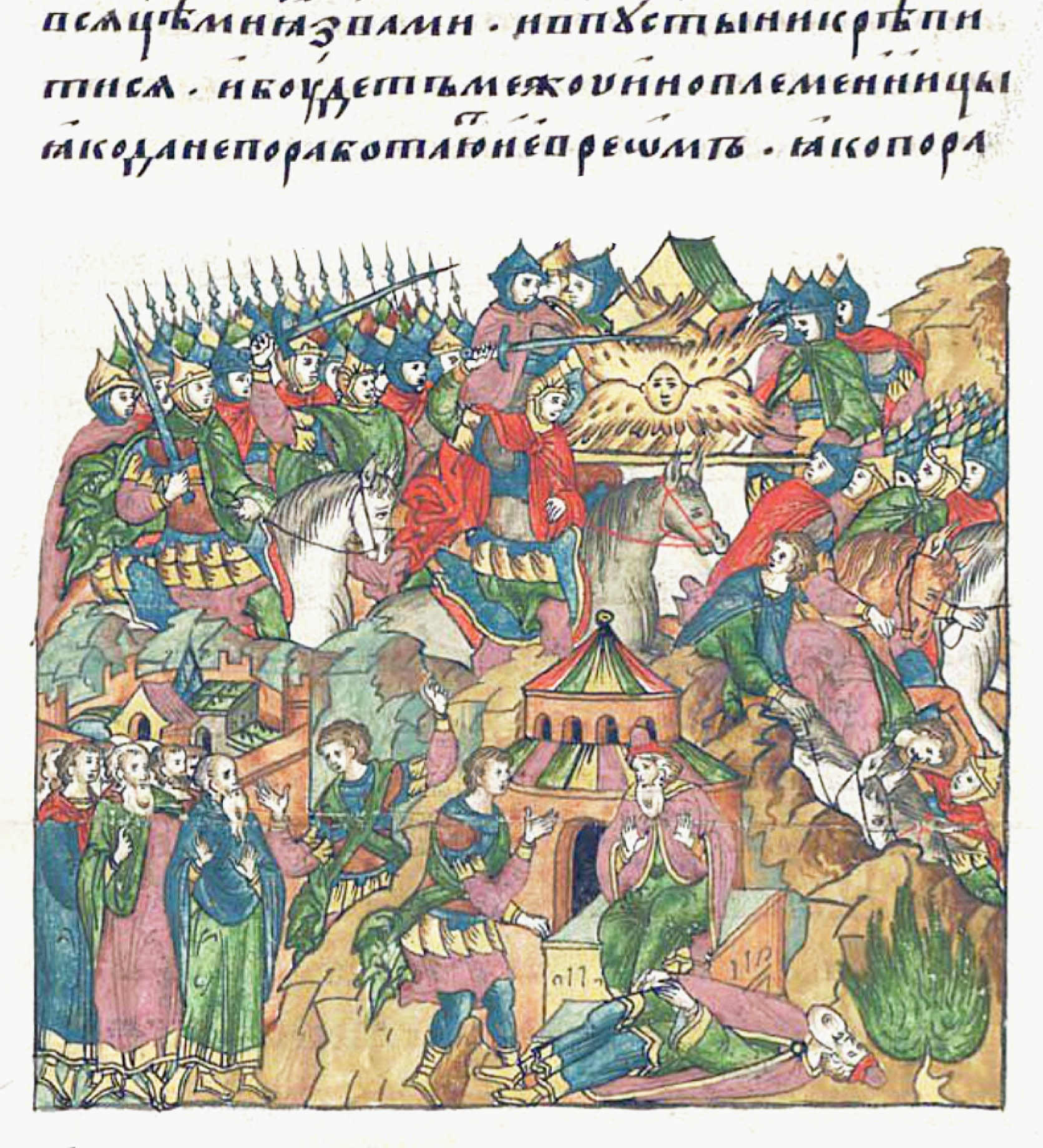
Death of Eli's sons

In the Talmud, some commentators argue that Phinehas was innocent of the crimes ascribed to him and that Hophni alone committed them, though Jonathan ben Uzziel declares that neither was wicked, and that this part of the biblical narrative, in which the crimes are imputed to them, should be regarded as having a figurative meaning.

According to another part of the Books of Samuel, Ichabod had a brother, Ahitub. That he is referred to as Ichabod's brother, rather than as another son of Phinehas, is considered by biblical scholars to suggest that Ichabod, barely mentioned in the Bible, was actually an important figure.
