= Shaphat (exilarch) =

2nd century AD Jewish leader in Mesopotamia

Shaphat was a Jewish exilarch of the 2nd century AD, succeeding his father, Johanan. Little is known about him or the office of the exilarch at this time. His name is found in most surviving genealogical lines of Davidic descent. He was the father of his successor, Huna Kamma, the first exilarch whose authority was recognized outside the realm of Babylonia.

== See also ==
- Seder Olam Zutta

Regnal titles
Preceded by Johanan	4th Babylonian Exilarch abt. 170	Succeeded by Anani
