= Azariah (High Priest) =

High Priest

Azariah (Hebrew: עֲזַרְיָה ‘Ǎzaryāh, "Yah has helped") was the third High Priest after Zadok. Cf. 1 Kings 4:2, where he is called "son of Zadok", although he is elsewhere identified as the son of Ahimaaz.

Although his name appears in the list of the Zadokite family (1 Chr. 5:30–40, 6:4-15 in other translations) there is no direct evidence in the Bible that he was a High Priest. According to the Book of Chronicles, Azariah was believed to have been a priest who served at King Solomon's Temple. Azariah (Azarias) does appear on the list of High Priests by Josephus.

== Patrilineal ancestry ==
Patrilineal descent
1. Abraham
2. Isaac
3. Jacob
4. Levi
5. Kehath
6. Amram
7. Aaron
8. Eleazar
9. Phinehas
10. Abishua
11. Bukki
12. Uzzi
13. Zerahiah
14. Meraioth
15. Azariah
16. Amariah
17. Ahitub
18. Zadok
19. Ahimaaz

== See also ==
- High Priest of Israel
- List of High Priests of Israel

== Footnotes and references ==
Israelite religious titles
Preceded by Ahimaaz	High Priest of Israel	Succeeded by Johanan; According to I Chronicles 6:9
Preceded by Ahimaaz	High Priest of Israel	Succeeded by Joash (According to the Seder Olam Zutta)
