= Jehoiarib =

Head of a family of Aaronian priests

Jehoiarib (Hebrew: יְהוֹיָרִיב Yehōyārîḇ, "Yahweh contends") was the head of a family of priests, which was made the first of the twenty-four priestly divisions organized by King David (reigned c. 1000–962 BCE).(1 Chr. 24:7)

In Jewish tradition, Jehoiarib was the priestly course on duty when the Second Temple was destroyed by the Roman Imperial army in the second week of the lunar month Av, in 70 CE. Meron, in Galilee, is presumed to have been settled by surviving members of the priestly stock Jehoiarib in the third-fourth centuries, since the town is mentioned as being affiliated with Jehoiarib, as inscribed in the Caesarea Inscription. A Talmudic reference mentions the priestly course in derision for its role in the Temple's destruction: "Jehoiarib, a man of Meron, the town Masarbaye" (יהויריב גברה מירון קרתה מסרביי), meaning, by a play on words, "he delivered" (Hebrew: מסר = masar), "the [Holy] house" (Hebrew: בייתא = bayta) "unto the enemy" (Hebrew: לשנאייא = le-senāyya).

== High Priest ==
There is no indication in the Tanakh that Jehoiarib was High Priest; his name doesn't appear in the list of the Zadokite dynasty (1 Chr. 5:30–40, 6:4–15 in other translations).

According to Seder Olam Zuta, he was one of the High Priests of Israel. He succeeded Joash and was succeeded by Jehoshaphat.

Jehoiarib doesn't appear on the High Priest list written by Josephus in his Antiquities of the Jews. On that list, Joram is succeeded by Isus.

== Footnotes and references ==
Israelite religious titles
Preceded by Joash (According to the Seder 'Olam Zutta)	High Priest of Israel	Succeeded by Jehoshaphat (According to the Seder 'Olam Zutta)
