= Bochim =

Bochim (also spelled Bokim: Hebrew: בֹּכִ֑ים ) is a place mentioned in the biblical Book of Judges, situated west of the River Jordan. Its name means 'weepers'.

== Biblical usage ==
Bochim appears in only one section of Judges (in verses 1 and 5 of chapter 2). In the narrative, it is the place at which the Israelites are rebuked by the angel of the Lord for making a covenant with the Canaanites, rather than taking possession of their land as they had been commanded. The name, "the place of weepers", refers to the Israelite response to this rebuke - they wept and offered sacrifices to God.

== Location ==
The exact location of Bochim is disputed, with commentators drawing different conclusions from the absence of other mentions in the Hebrew Bible. Some, such as Charles Fox Burney, suggest that Bochim is actually another name for Bethel, and Anglican theologian George Albert Cooke, writing in the Cambridge Bible for Schools and Colleges, has "little doubt" that the two are the same. Burney draws attention to the unusual appearance of the name 'Bochim' before the incident after which the place is supposedly named, as well as highlighting the Septuagint translation of verse 1: 'to Bochim and to Bethel and to the House of Israel'. Other commentators suggest that Bochim was located near Bethel, and that the lack of other Biblical mentions is due to Bochim ceasing to be an important place in the life of Israel. Y. Kaufmann proposes that Bochim was a place of assembly near to Bethel, whilst G. F. Moore has associated Bochim with Shiloh. Other theories have also been advanced.

== Bibliography ==
- Amit, Yaira, Hidden Polemics in Biblical Narrative (BRILL, 2000)
- Gomes, Jules, The Sanctuary of Bethel and the Configuration of Israelite Identity (Walter de Gruyter, 2006)
