= Ahijah (exilarch) =

2nd century AD Jewish leader in Mesopotamia

Ahijah was a Jewish exilarch of the 2nd century CE. There are no known holders of the office prior to his tenure, and his name does not appear in the Seder Olam Zutta. He is potentially the son of Akkub, who is commonly noted in contemporary Jewish genealogies.

Regnal titles
Preceded by Office Established	1st Babylonian Exilarch abt. 140	Succeeded by Nahum
