= Aphek (biblical) =

Biblical place

Coordinates: 32.0833°N 34.8833°E

The name Aphek or Aphec refers to one of several locations mentioned in the Hebrew Bible as the scenes of a number of battles between the Israelites and the Arameans and Philistines:

- Most famously, a town near which one or more rulers of Damascus named Ben-hadad were defeated by the Israelites and in which the Damascene king and his surviving soldiers found a safe place of retreat (1 Kings 20:26–30; 2 Kings 13:17, 24–25). Just before his death, the prophet Elisha predicted:

"The arrow of the Lord's deliverance and the arrow of deliverance from Syria; for you must strike the Syrians at Aphek till you have destroyed them (2 Kings 13:17).

- A place at which the Bible states that the Philistines had encamped, while the Israelites pitched in Eben-Ezer, before the Battle of Aphek in which the sons of Eli were killed (I Samuel 4:1–ff.)
- A city of the Tribe of Issachar, near to Jezreel, in the north of the Sharon plain. The scene of another encampment of the Philistines, which led to the defeat and death of Saul.
- Aphik, a city of the tribe of Asher, identified as either Tel Afek near Haifa, or Afqa in Lebanon.

== Location ==
=== Golan or eastern shore of the Sea of Galilee ===
After the turn of the 20th century the predominant opinion was that the location of all these battles is one and the same, and that the town lay east of the Jordan. Initially it was thought that the name is preserved in the now depopulated village of Fiq near Kibbutz Afik, three miles east of the Sea of Galilee, where an ancient mound, Tell Soreg, had been identified. Excavations by Moshe Kochavi and Pirhiya Beck in 1987–1988 have indeed discovered a fortified ninth- and eighth-century BCE settlement, probably Aramean, but Kochavi considered it to be too small to serve the role ascribed to Aphek in the Bible. The site most favoured now by the archaeologists is Tel 'En Gev/Khirbet el-'Asheq, a mound located within Kibbutz Ein Gev.

A more recent theory has focused on regarding this same Aphek also as the scene of the two battles against the Philistines mentioned by the Bible - the supposition being that the Syrians were invading Israel from the western side, which was their most vulnerable.

=== Judaean hills ===
Since most scholars agree that there were more than one Aphek, C.R. Conder identified the Aphek of Eben-Ezer with a ruin (khirbet) some 3.7 miles (6 km) distant from Dayr Aban (believed to be Eben-Ezer), and known by the name Marj al-Fikiya; the name al-Fikiya being an Arabic corruption of Aphek. Eusebius, when writing about Eben-ezer in his Onomasticon, says that it is "the place from which the Gentiles seized the Ark, between Jerusalem and Ascalon, near the village of Bethsamys (Beit Shemesh)," a locale that corresponds with Conder's identification.
