= Ahitub (High Priest) =

High Priest of Israel

Ahitub (Hebrew: אֲחִיטוּב ʾĂḥīṭūḇ, "my brother is goodness" or "brother of goodness") was a High Priest of Israel cited in the Bible.

He was the son of Phinehas, grandson of Eli, and brother of Ichabod.

On the death of his grandfather Eli he most likely succeeded to the office of High Priest of Israel, and would have been succeeded by his son Ahijah (references to Ahitub as the father of Ahijah are in 1 Sam. 14:3; 22:9, 11, 12, 20 and 1 Chr 9:11). Ahijah (also spelled Ahiah), who is listed as his son in 1 Samuel 14:2-3, 18-19, may have been the same person as Ahimelech (1 Samuel 22:9-20), or he may have been another son of Ahitub (probably an elder son if this was the case).

Israelite religious titles
Preceded by Eli	High Priest of Israel	Succeeded by Ahijah
