= Eli (biblical figure) =

High priest of Shiloh in ancient Israel

- עֵלִי
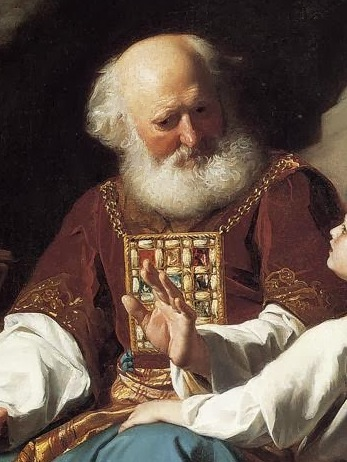
- Detail of Eli from Samuel Relating to Eli the Judgements of God upon Eli's House (1780) by John Singleton Copley

Personal life
- Died: Shiloh
- Children: Hophni and Phinehas

Religious life
- Religion: Abrahamic

Eli (/ˈilaɪ/ EE-lye; Hebrew: עֵלִי, Modern: ʿElī, Tiberian: ʿĒlī, lit. 'ascent' or 'above'; Koine Greek: Ἠλί Ēlī́ or Ἠλεί Ēleí; Latin: Heli; fl. c. 11th century BC) was, according to the Book of Samuel, a priest and a judge of the Israelites in the city of Shiloh, ancient Israel. When Hannah came to Shiloh to pray for a son, Eli initially accused her of drunkenness, but when she protested her innocence, Eli wished her well. Hannah's eventual child, Samuel, was raised by Eli in the tabernacle. When Eli failed to rein in the abusive behavior of his own sons, God promised to punish his family, which resulted in the death of Eli's sons at the Battle of Aphek where the Ark of the Covenant was also captured. When Eli heard the news of the captured Ark, he fell from his seat, broke his neck, and died. Later biblical passages mention the fortunes of several of Eli's descendants.

Eli occupies a prominent place in Samaritan religious tradition, as the Samaritans attribute the schism between their community and the Jews to Eli's establishment of a rival shrine at Shiloh, challenging what they regard as the original Israelite sacred site, Mount Gerizim.

== Biblical narrative ==
Eli was a priest (kohen) of Shiloh, the second-to-last Israelite judge (succeeded only by Samuel) before the rule of the Kings of Israel and Judah.

=== Hannah ===
This story of Hannah, with which the Books of Samuel begin, involves Eli. Hannah was the wife of Elkanah. She was childless. Elkanah also had another wife (Peninnah) who bore him children. Peninnah, at every chance, teased and criticised Hannah about her barrenness, to the point of Hannah's deep despair. Their husband Elkanah saw Hannah's distress, and attempted to discover the cause of her distress by asking "Hannah, why do you weep? Why do you not eat? Why is your heart sad? Am I not more to you than ten sons?"

The story indicates that Hannah gave no answer to the questions, and instead rose and presented herself before God. She wept bitterly in the temple of Shiloh. In her despair, Hannah prayed to God for a child, and promising that if her prayer is granted, she would dedicate her son to God. When Eli found Hannah in the temple, she was praying silently with her lips moving. Eli witnessed this unusual behavior, and concluded that Hannah was intoxicated. After Hannah's explanation of her sobriety, Eli said, "Go in peace, and may the God of Israel grant you what you have requested." Hannah went home, filled with hope. Subsequently, Hannah became pregnant; her child was named Samuel. At the time to offer the yearly sacrifice at the temple, Hannah remained home. She promised to go to the temple, when Samuel was weaned and planned to leave him with Eli to be trained as a Nazirite.

=== The sons of Eli ===
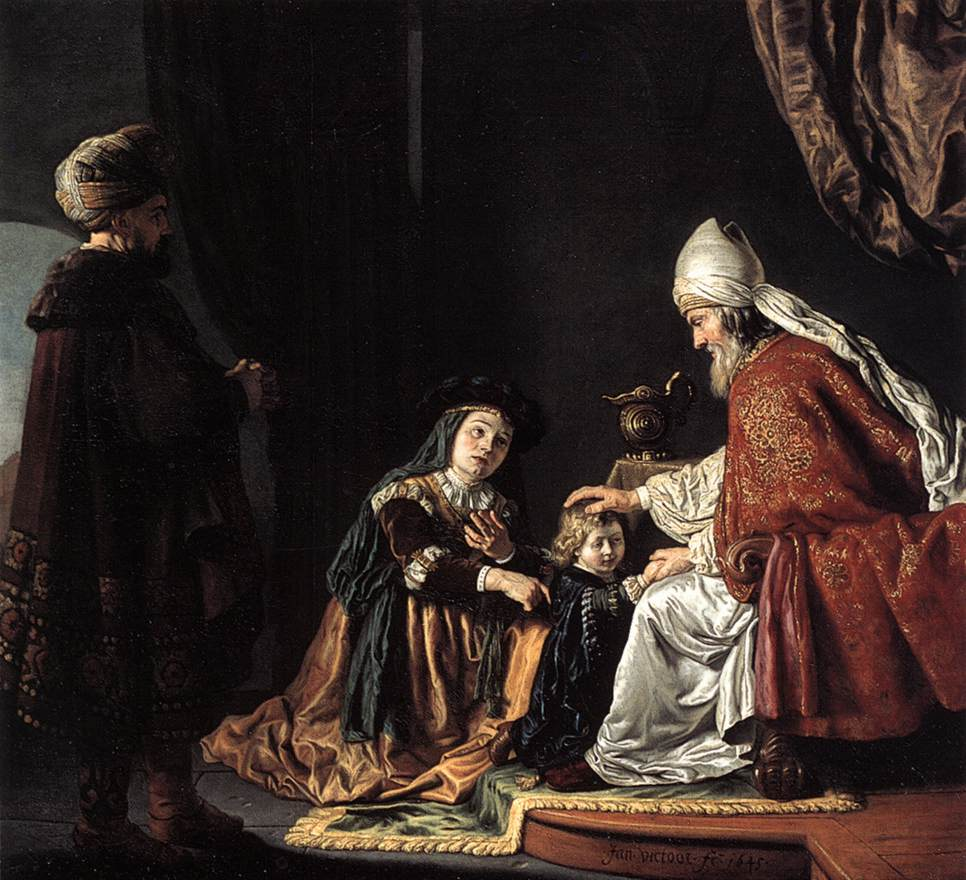
1645 painting by Jan Victors of Hannah presenting her son Samuel to Eli, who is seated on the right

The sons of Eli, Hophni and Phinehas, meanwhile, were behaving wickedly, for example by taking for themselves all the prime cuts of meat from sacrifices, and by committing adultery with the women who serve at the sanctuary entrance. Eli was aware of their behavior but he rebuked them too lightly and ultimately did not stop them. The sons continued in their sinful behavior, and "a man of God" prophesied to Eli that Eli and his family would be punished for this, with all male descendants dying before reaching old age and being placed in positions subservient to prophets from other lineages. The curse alludes to a previous promise from God of Eli's lineage continuing eternally (Eli being a descendant of Aaron, to whom the promise was initially given [Exodus 28]) (cf. similar promises to King David and Jehonadab). While this continuation was not revoked, a curse was placed on all of Eli's male descendants forever. As a sign of the accuracy of this future, Eli was told that his sons would die on the same day.

=== Samuel's training ===
Eli went on to train Samuel. When Samuel heard God speaking to him, he at first mistook God for Eli; Eli, who didn't hear God calling Samuel, eventually realized the truth, and instructed Samuel on how to respond. Samuel was told that God's threat would be carried out on Eli and his family. Eli asked Samuel what he had been told, insisting that he be told the whole truth, and so Samuel did; Eli reacted by saying that God will do as He judges best.

=== Philistine attack and the death of Eli ===
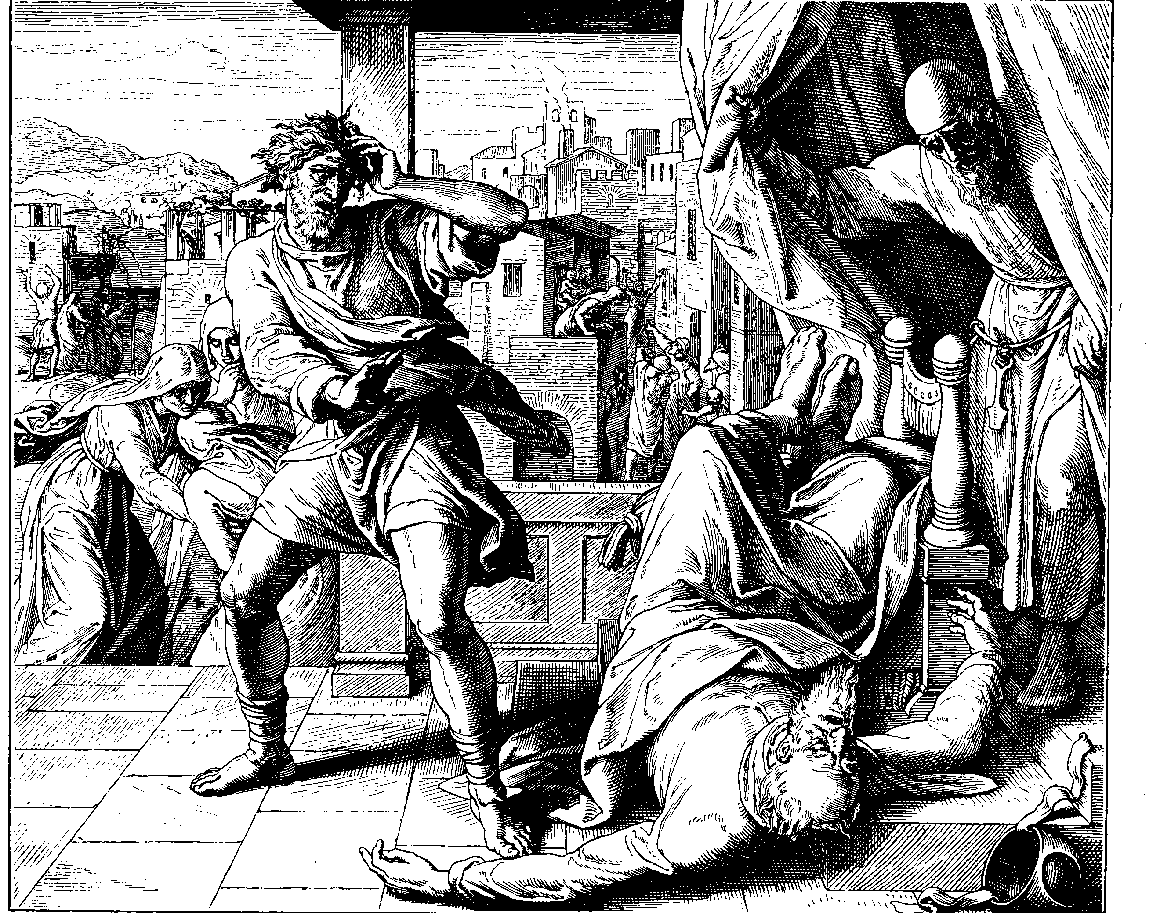
Death of Eli, 1860 woodcut by Julius Schnorr von Karolsfeld

Some years later, the Philistines attacked Eben-Ezer, eventually capturing the Ark of the Covenant from the Israelites and killing Eli's sons who had accompanied the Ark to battle. The Israelites had brought the Ark with them to battle under the premise that it would bring them victory. Eli, who was nearly blind, was sitting at the front gate to hear the returning soldiers return and was unaware of the event until he asked about all the commotion in the city. A soldier had returned and brought the news of the battle to the people. In reaction to the news that the Ark of God had been captured, Eli fell backwards out of the chair and struck his head, whence he died.

He was a Judge of Israel for a total of 40 years. His daughter-in-law, the wife of Phinehas, was pregnant and near the time of delivery. When she heard the news that the Ark of God had been captured and that her father-in-law and husband were dead, she went into labour and gave birth, but was overcome by labour pains. As she lay dying, she named the boy Ichabod, saying The Glory has departed from Israel, because of the capture of the Ark of God and the deaths of her father-in-law and her husband.

=== Era ===
Samson, who fought the Philistine incursions, judged Israel for 20 years. Some scholars, like Kessler, and Nowack have argued that there is likely to have been some overlap between the time of Samson and that of Eli. However, the Book of Judges always mentions the years of oppression in contrast to the period of a judge's dispensation; since the early parts of Eli's rule do not appear to occur during a time of oppression, this appears to rule out any overlap with the Philistine oppression that Samson, a previous judge, had lived under.

=== Genealogy ===
Though his own genealogy is not given by the text, a number of scholars have determined that Eli was descended from Itamar son of Aaron, based on genealogies given elsewhere regarding his various descendants. Ahimelech belonged to the house of Itamar, and was also descended from Ahitub, who was descended from Eli.

=== Descendants ===
The House of Eli included:

- Ahimelech, great-grandson of Eli: slain by Doeg the Edomite, fulfilling part of the curse on the House of Eli that none of his male descendants would live to old age.
- Abiathar, son of Ahimelech: great-great-grandson of Eli; the only survivor of the massacre at Nob, and the last High Priest of the House of Eli, deposed from office by King Solomon, thus fulfilling the other part of the curse on the House of Eli that the priesthood would pass from his family.

== In rabbinical literature ==
=== Talmud ===
The Talmud lists Eli as a prophet.

The rabbis described Samuel, Eli's student, as having ruled that it was legitimate for laymen to slaughter sacrifices, since the halakha only insisted that the priests bring the blood (cf. Leviticus 1:5, Zevahim 32a). Eli is said to have reacted to this logic of Samuel by arguing that it was correct, but Samuel should be put to death for making legal statements while Eli (his mentor) was present.

=== Phineas/Ithamar controversy ===
Rabbinical commentators explain that the continuity of high priesthood is put forth to the descendants of Phineas from Numbers 25:13. According to some rabbinical commentators, Phineas sinned by not providing Torah instruction to the masses prior to the Battle of Gibeah, and by failing to relieve Jephthah of his vow. As consequence, the high priesthood was taken from him and given (temporarily) to the offspring of Ithamar, specifically Eli and his sons.

However, upon the sin of Eli's sons Hophni and Phinehas, it was prophesied that the high priesthood would be returned to a different priest who would be more loyal:

And I will raise up myself a reliable priest who acts with my heart, and with my soul he will do, and I will build him a reliable household, and he will go before my Anointed for all days.

A number of scholars indicate that Zadok was the subject of this prophecy when Zadok, said to be of the progeny of Eleazar, was ultimately appointed as high priest.

=== Descendants ===
In addition to the individuals whose descent from Eli can be determined from the Biblical text, rabbinical literature cites other individuals as descendants of Eli.

- Jeremiah: it is suggested that Jeremiah was descended from Abiathar (When King Solomon thrust out Abiathar from the priesthood, he exiled him to his fields at Anathoth (1 Kings 2:26-27). Jeremiah was one of the priests living at Anathoth (Jeremiah 1:1), so this suggestion would seem quite reasonable).
- Rabbah bar Nahmani, Babylonian Jewish Talmudist (Amora).
- Abaye, Babylonian Jewish Talmudist, nephew of Rabbah bar Nahmani
- Bebai ben Abaye, Babylonian Jewish Talmudist, son of Abaye

Rabbah died at age 40 and his nephew Abaye died at age 60.

== Samaritan sources ==
The Samaritans assert that Mount Gerizim was the original Holy Place of Israel from the time that Joshua conquered Israel and the ten tribes settled the land. According to the Bible, the story of Mount Gerizim takes us back to the story of the time when Moses ordered Joshua to take the Twelve Tribes of Israel to the mountains by Shechem and place half of the tribes, six in number, on the top of Mount Gerizim (Mount of the Blessing), and the other half in Mount Ebal (Mount of the Curse). The two mountains were used to symbolize the significance of the commandments and serve as a warning to whoever disobeyed them.

The Samaritans have insisted that they are direct descendants of the Northern Israelite tribes of Ephraim and Manasseh, who survived the destruction of the Northern Kingdom of Israel by the Assyrians in 722 BC. The inscription of Sargon II records the deportation of a relatively small proportion of the Israelites (27,290, according to the annals), so it is quite possible that a sizable population remained that could identify themselves as Israelites, the term that the Samaritans prefer for themselves. Samaritan historiography would place the basic schism from the remaining part of Israel after the twelve tribes conquered the land of Canaan, led by Yahshua. After Yahshua's death, Eli the priest left the tabernacle which Moses erected in the desert and established on Mount Gerizim, and built another one under his own rule in the hills of Shilo (1 Samuel 1:1-3; 2:12-17). Thus, he established both an illegitimate priesthood and an illegitimate place of worship.

Abu l-Fath, who in the fourteenth century CE wrote a major work of Samaritan history, comments on Samaritan origins as follows:

A terrible civil war broke out between Eli son of Yafni, of the line of Ithamar, and the sons of Phineas, because Eli son of Yafni resolved to usurp the High Priesthood from the descendents of Phineas. He used to offer sacrifices on an altar of stones. He was 50 years old, endowed with wealth and in charge of the treasury of the children of Israel...

He offered a sacrifice on the altar, but without salt, as if he were inattentive. When the Great High Priest Ozzi learned of this, and found the sacrifice was not accepted, he thoroughly disowned him; and it is (even) said that he rebuked him.

Thereupon he and the group that sympathized with him, rose in revolt and at once he and his followers and his beasts set off for Shiloh. Thus Israel split in factions. He sent to their leaders saying to them, Anyone who would like to see wonderful things, let him come to me. Then he assembled a large group around him in Shiloh, and built a Temple for himself there; he constructed a place like the Temple (on Mount Gerizim). He built an altar, omitting no detail – it all corresponded to the original, piece by piece.

At this time the Children of Israel split into three factions. A loyal faction on Mount Gerizim; a heretical faction that followed false gods; and the faction that followed Eli son of Yafni on Shiloh.

Further, the Samaritan Chronicle Adler, or New Chronicle, believed to have been composed in the 18th century using earlier chronicles as sources states:

And the children of Israel in his days divided into three groups. One did according to the abominations of the Gentiles and served other Gods; another followed Eli the son of Yafni, although many of them turned away from him after he had revealed his intentions; and a third remained with the High Priest Uzzi ben Bukki, the chosen place, Mount Gerizim Bethel, in the holy city of Shechem.

According to the Samaritans this marked the end of the Age of Divine Favor called רידון (Ridhwan) or רהוּתה (Rahuta), which began with Moses. Thus began the פנוּתה (Fanuta) Era of Divine Disfavor when God looks away from the people. According to the Samaritans the age of divine favor will only return with the coming of the Taheb (Messiah or Restorer).

Likewise according to Samaritan sources, the priestly line of the sons of Phineas died out in 1624 with the death of the 112th High Priest Shlomyah ben Pinhas, upon which the priesthood was transferred to the sons of Ithamar.

== Islamic traditions ==
In Islam, there is very little to no mention of Ili (Arabic: إلي). He is known in the Bible as the high priest who raised prophet Samu'il and judged Israel at Shiloh.

== See also ==
- Biblical judges
- Books of Samuel

Eli (biblical figure) Tribe of Levi
Preceded by Samson	Judge of Israel	Succeeded by Samuel
Preceded by Uzzi	High Priest of Israel	Succeeded by Ahitub
