= Yairah Amit =

Israeli biblical scholar

- יַעֲרָה עָמִית
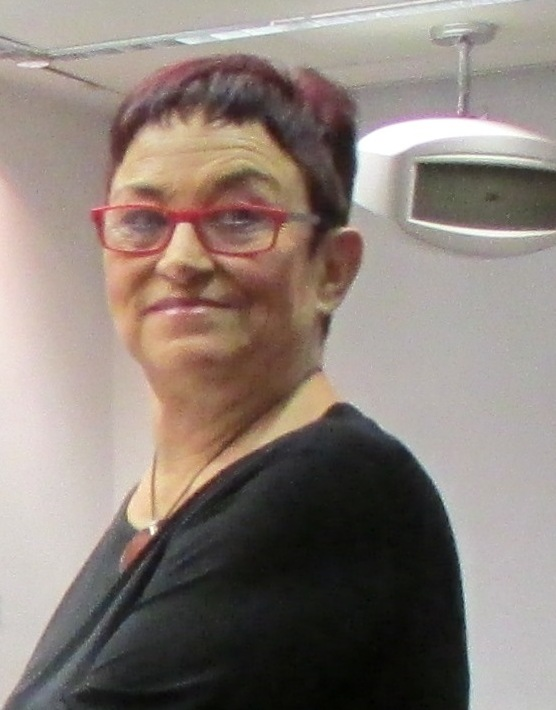
- Born: 19 October 1941 (age 84); Tel Aviv, Mandatory Palestine
- Occupations: Biblical Scholar, Professor

Academic background
- Education: Hebrew University of Jerusalem, Tel Aviv University
- Website: https://english.tau.ac.il/profile/ayairah

Yairah Amit (Hebrew: יַעֲרָה עָמִית; born 19 October 1941 in Tel Aviv) is an Israeli biblical scholar. Amit studied at the Hebrew University of Jerusalem before doing a PhD at Tel Aviv University under the supervision of Meir Sternberg. She is currently professor of biblical studies at Tel Aviv University. In 2012 a Festschrift was published in her honor. Words, Ideas, Worlds: Biblical Essays in Honour of Yairah Amit (ISBN 1-90753-450-4) included contributions from Athalya Brenner, Cheryl Exum, and Yael Feldman.

== Public activity ==
Yaira Amit's academic pursuits were also combined with public activities related to the Bible and its teachings. In this framework, she served on various committees of the Ministry of Education and Culture, such as the Higher Professional Committee for Bible Teaching, in which she was a member and then chairman, the Matriculation Examination Questionnaire Committee, the Teaching Committee, etc. She was a partner in establishing the bulletin for Bible teachers in public schools: "On the agenda", she served as a member of the steering team of the Department of the Bible and Israel Sources of the President's House, serves as a member of various academic councils, and more, and is also one of the members of the public board of the National Library.

Between 1998-2003 she served as the chairman of the program committee and was responsible for the production of the new curriculum in the Bible for the state education system from Kindergarten to 12th grade, known as the "Curriculum 5633" and serves the system to this day (2008). Her lectures for Bible teachers and the general public present the relevance of biblical literature as a national and universal literature, which despite its antiquity is still relevant.

== Selected works ==
=== Books ===
- The book of Judges : the art of editing, 1992
- Sefer Shofṭim : omanut ha-ʻarikhah, 1992
- Hidden polemics in biblical narrative, 1996
- History and ideology : an introduction to historiography in the Hebrew Bible, 1997
- Shofṭim : ʻim mavo u-ferush, 1999
- Reading biblical narratives : literary criticism and the Hebrew Bible, 2000
- Galui ṿe-nistar ba-Miḳra : pulmusim geluyim, ʻaḳifim uṿe-iḳar semuyim, 2003
- Essays on ancient Israel in its Near Eastern context : a tribute to Nadav Naʼaman, 2006
- In praise of editing in the Hebrew Bible : collected essays in retrospect, 2012

=== Articles ===
- Amit, Yairah. “The Dual Causality Principle and Its Effects on Biblical Literature.” Vetus Testamentum 37, no. 4 (1987): 385–400. JSTOR https://www.jstor.org/stable/1517556
- Amit, Yairah. “‘The Glory of Israel Does Not Deceive or Change His Mind’: On the Reliability of Narrator and Speakers in Biblical Narrative.” Prooftexts 12, no. 3 (1992): 201–12. JSTOR http://www.jstor.org/stable/20689339
- Amit, Yairah. “The Study of Hebrew Bible in Israel — between Love and Knowledge.” Jewish History 21, no. 2 (2007): 199–208. JSTOR http://www.jstor.org/stable/20728542
