= Eben-Ezer =

Location in the Books of Samuel

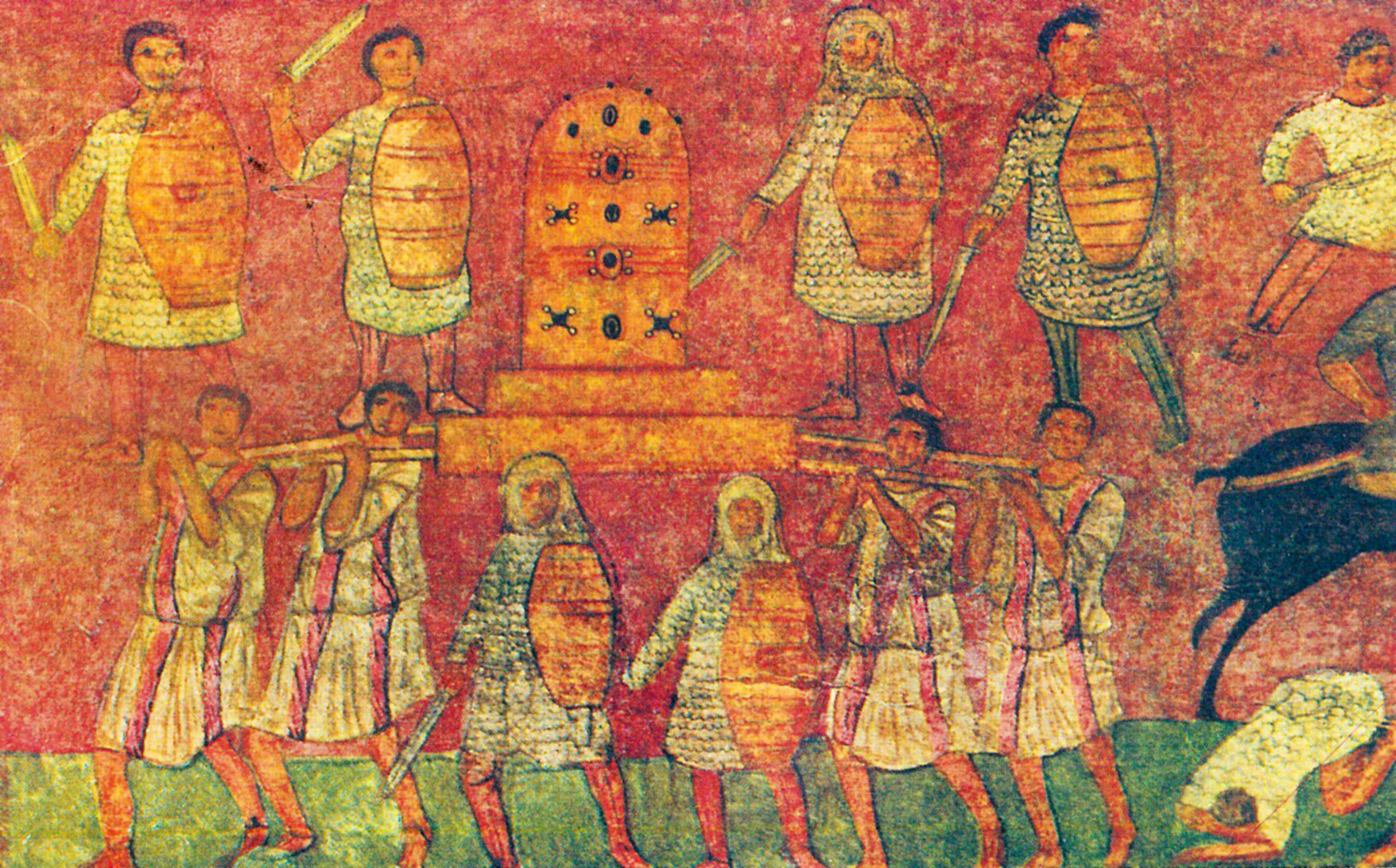
Depiction of the Battle of Eben-Ezer from the Dura-Europos synagogue (pre-244 AD)

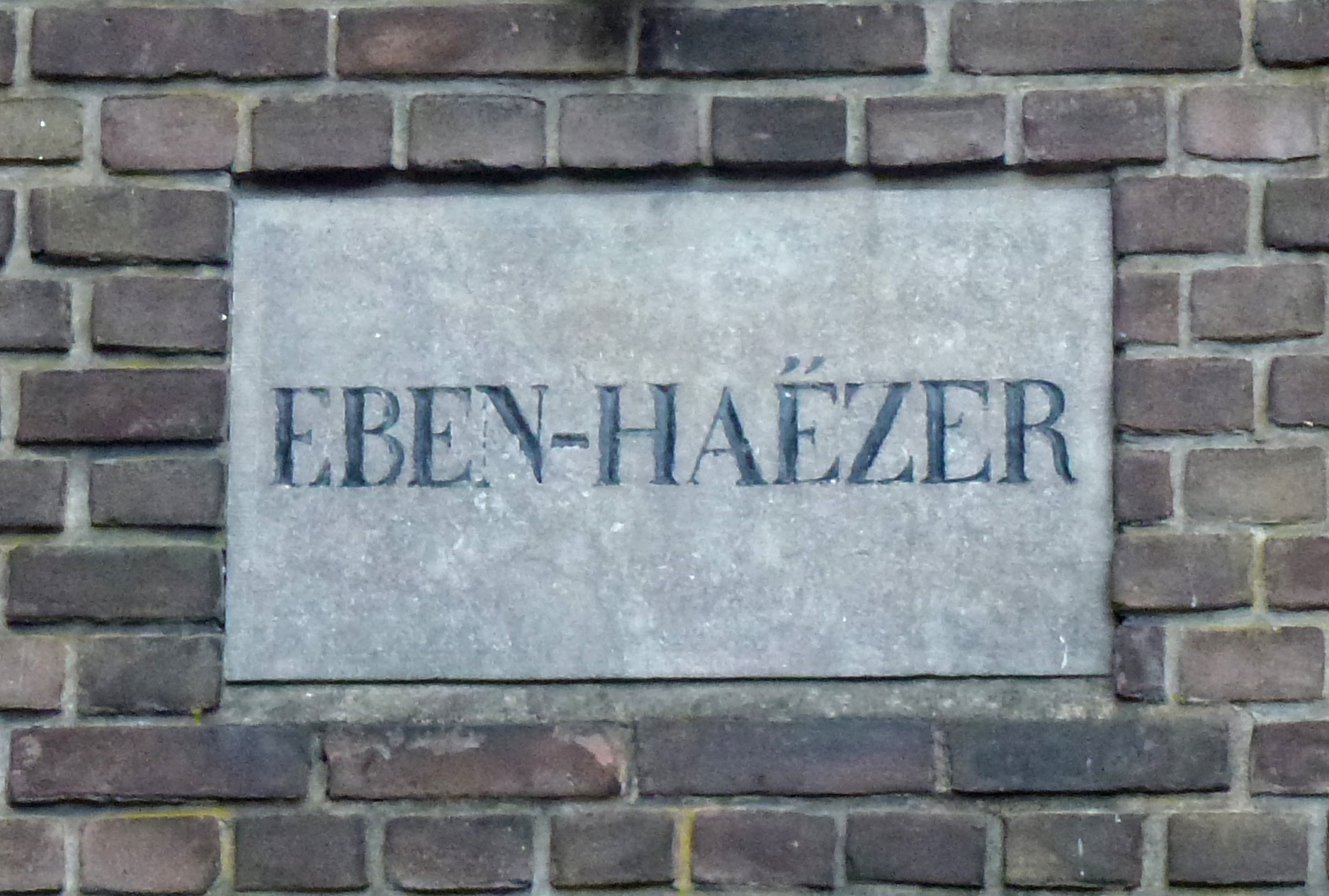
Gouda, Netherlands

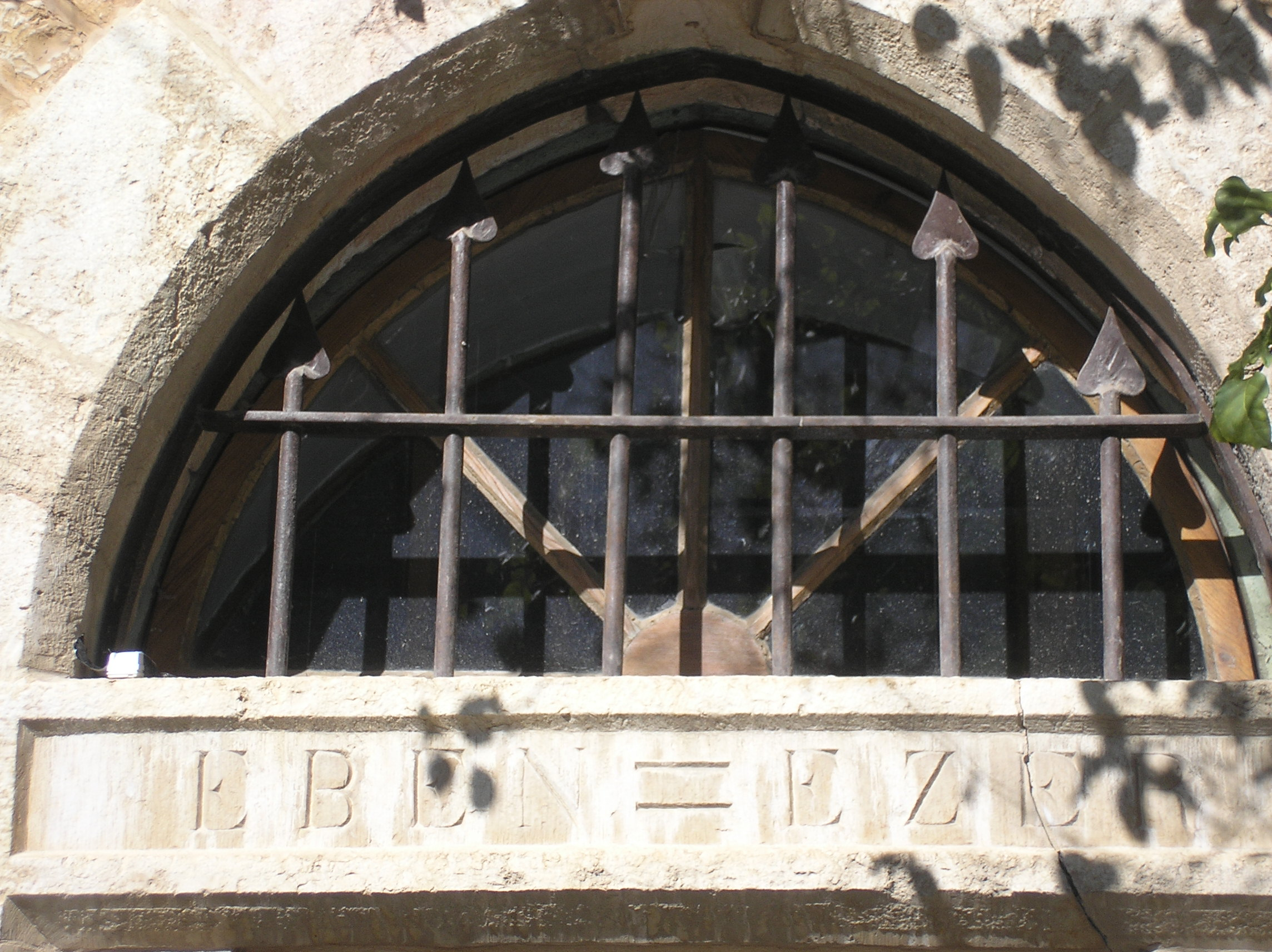
Inscription: Eben-Ezer on the Matthaus Frank House, today #6 Emek Refaim Street in Jerusalem

Eben-Ezer (Hebrew: אֶבֶן הָעֵזֶר, romanized: ’éḇen hā‘ēzer, lit. 'the stone of help') is a location that is mentioned by the Books of Samuel as the scene of battles between the Israelites and Philistines. It is specified as having been less than a day's journey by foot from Shiloh, near Aphek, in the vicinity of Mizpah, near the western entrance of the pass of Bethoron. Its location has not been identified in modern times with much certainty, with some identifying it with Beit Iksa, and others with Dayr Aban.

== Biblical mentions ==
The placename appears in the Books of Samuel in two narratives:

- In the first narrative (1 Samuel 4:1–11), the Philistines defeat the Israelites, even though the Israelites bring the Ark of the Covenant onto the battlefield in hope of bringing about a divinely assured victory. The victorious Philistines capture the Ark, and do not return it until many months later (1 Samuel 6:1–2).
- In the second narrative (1 Samuel 7:2–14), the Israelites defeat the Philistines after Samuel has offered a sacrifice. Samuel puts up a stone in memorial and names it Eben-Ezer (the placename in the previous narrative resulting from this). The hymn "Come Thou Fount of Every Blessing" refers to this monument.

== Modern-day placement ==
Many Israeli archaeologists and historians argue that the Eben-Ezer of the first biblical narrative was in the immediate neighborhood of modern-day Kafr Qasim, near Antipatris (ancient city Aphek).

The Izbet Sartah mound, the proposed location of Eben-Ezer, is located just to the east of this area. It is located to the north of the town of Rosh HaAyin, in the fields between Rosh HaAyin and Kfar Qasim.

The second battle's location is deemed insufficiently well-defined in the Biblical text for certainty.

Some scholars hold that there was more than one Aphek. C. R. Conder identified the Aphek of Eben-Ezer with a khirbet "ruin" some 3.7 miles (6 km) distant from Dayr Aban (believed to be Eben-Ezer), and known by the name Marj al-Fikiya; the name al-Fikiya being an Arabic etymological variant of Aphek. Eusebius, when writing about Eben-Ezer in his Onomasticon, says that it is "the place from which the Gentiles seized the Ark, between Jerusalem and Ascalon, near the village of Bethsamys (Beit Shemesh)", a locale that corresponds with Conder's identification. The same site, near Beth Shemesh, has also been identified by Epiphanius of Salamis as Eben-Ezer.

== See also ==
- Ebenezer (given name)
- Song of Moses
