= Shiloh (biblical city) =

Ancient Israelite city and sanctuary

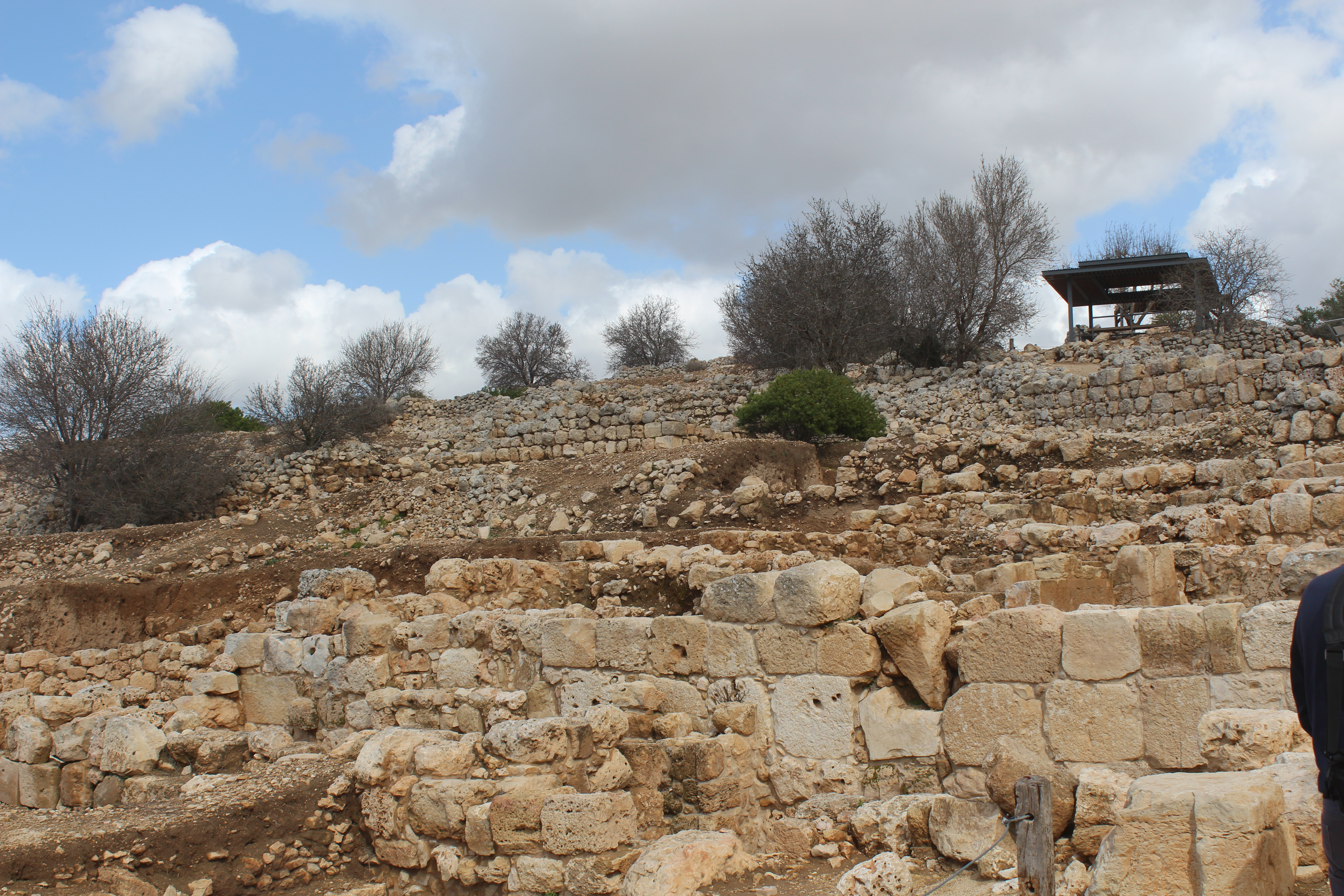

- Location within the West Bank
- 32.0556°N 35.2895°E
- Periods: Bronze Age, Iron Age, Byzantine period
- Cultures: Canaanite, Israelite, Roman
- Location: Shiloh, West Bank.
- Region: Ramallah and al-Bireh Governorate

Site notes
- Condition: Ruins
- Public access: Yes
- Website: www.a-shiloh.co.il/en

Shiloh (/ˈʃaɪloʊ/; Hebrew: שִׁלֹה, שִׁלוֹ ,שִׁילֹה, שִׁילוֹ, romanized: Šīlō) was an ancient city and sanctuary in ancient Israel now located in the West Bank. According to the Hebrew Bible, Shiloh was one of the main centers of Israelite worship during the pre-monarchic period, before the First Temple in Jerusalem was built. According to the Hebrew Bible, after the Israelite conquest of Canaan, the Tabernacle was moved to Shiloh, and remained there during the period of the Hebrew Bible judges.

Shiloh has been identified with modern Khirbet Seilun, a tell known in Modern Hebrew as Tel Shiloh. It is located 31 kilometres (19 mi) north of Jerusalem, in the West Bank, to the west of the modern Israeli settlement of Shilo and to the north of the Palestinian town of Turmus Ayya. Relative to other archaeological sites, it is south of the biblical town of Lebonah and 16 kilometres (10 mi) north of Bethel. G. F. Moore has suggested identifying Bochim as Shiloh.

== Etymology ==
The meaning of the word "Shiloh" is unclear. The name has been argued to have been derived from שלה and may be translated as Tranquility Town. Ran Zadok argued that the toponym derives from שׁ–א–ל.

== Identification ==
When American biblical scholar Edward Robinson toured the region in 1838, he proposed that Shiloh corresponded to Seilun.

It was identified unambiguously with Khirbet Seilun, based on the description of the site's location found in Judges 21:19:

So they said, "Look, the yearly festival of Yahweh is taking place at Shiloh, which is north of Bethel, on the east of the highway that goes up from Bethel to Shechem, and south of Lebonah."

— Book of Judges, 21:19

Bethel has been identified with Beitin, Lebonah with Al-Lubban ash-Sharqiya, "the highway" with the Way of the Patriarchs, and Shechem with Tell Balata.

The Arabic name, Khirbet Seilun, preserves the ancient Hebrew name.

In the 4th century CE, Eusebius and Jerome demonstrated some awareness of Shiloh's location, as did the cartographer of the Madaba Map in the 6th century.

== History ==
=== Bronze Age ===
During the Middle and Late Bronze Age (MBA and LBA), Shiloh was a walled city in Canaan with a shrine or sanctuary.

- Shiloh Stratum 18 (MB IB or MB IIA).
- Shiloh Stratum 17B-A (MBA II-III).
- Shiloh Stratum 16 (LBA) in the 13th to 12th centuries BC.

=== Iron Age ===
Shiloh was one of the main centers of Yahwism during the premonarchic period.

The destruction of Shiloh in Iron Age I is dated by radiocarbon tests to the second half of the 11th century BCE.

- Shiloh Strata 15-14 (Iron IA-B) in the 12th to 10th centuries BCE.
- Shiloh Strata 13-10 (Iron IIA-C) in the 10th to early 6th century BC.

==== Hebrew Bible ====
Shiloh is mentioned in the Books of Genesis, Joshua, Judges, 1 Samuel, 1 Kings, Psalms, and Jeremiah.

Shiloh was first mentioned in the Hebrew Bible in the Blessing of Jacob in Genesis 49:10:

The scepter shall not depart from Judah, nor a lawgiver from between his feet until Shiloh come; and unto Him shall the gathering of the people be.

In the Book of Joshua, when the Israelites arrived in the land, they set up the Tabernacle. There Joshua and Eleazar divided the land among the Twelve Tribes who had not yet received their allocation in Joshua 18:1–10, and dealt with the allocation of Levitical cities in Joshua 21:1–8. Subsequently, Shiloh became one of the leading religious shrines in ancient Israel, a status it held until shortly before David's elevation of Jerusalem. Joshua 18:1 notes, "The whole congregation of Israel assembled together at Shiloh and set up the tent (or tabernacle) of the congregation there." The tabernacle had been built under Moses' direction from God in Exodus 26 (discussed in the parashah "Terumah") to house the Ark of the Covenant, also made according to Moses' instructions from God in Exodus 25. Talmudic sources state that the Tabernacle remained at Shiloh for 369 years, until the Ark of the Covenant was taken into the battle camp at Eben-Ezer in 1 Samuel 4:3–5 and captured by the Philistines at Aphek (probably Antipatris). At some point during its long stay at Shiloh, the portable tent seems to have been enclosed within a holy compound—in Greek, a "temenos". It was at Shiloh that Eli and Samuel ministered according to 1 Samuel (1 Sam 3:21). At some point, the Tabernacle was moved to Gibeon according to 1 Chronicles 16 and 21, and 2 Chronicles 1 (1 Chr 16:39–40, 1 Chr 21:20, 2 Chr 1:39–2), which became an Israelite holy site under David and Solomon.

The people made pilgrimages there for major feasts and sacrifices, and Judges 21 records the place as the site of an annual dance of maidens among the vineyards.

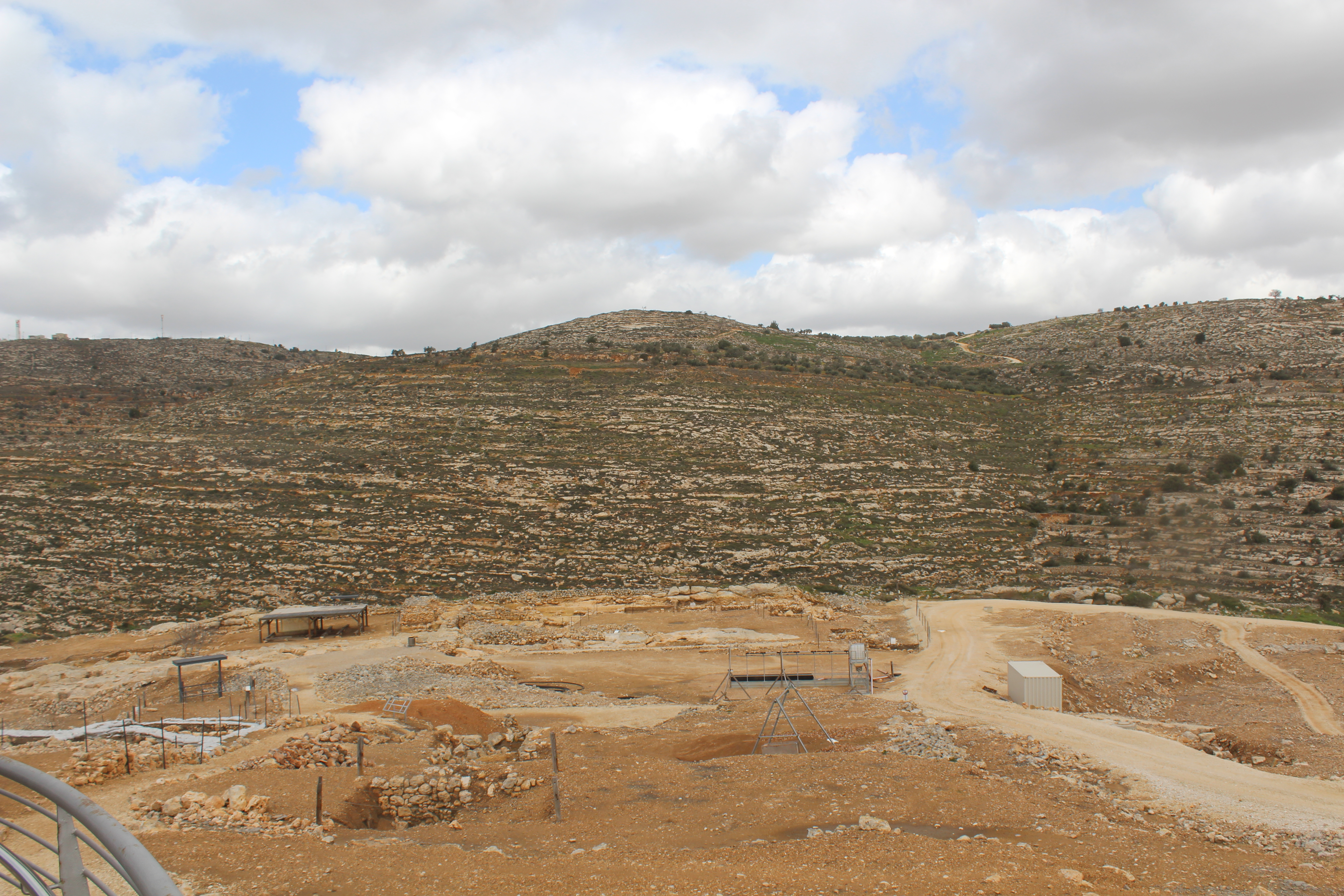
Presumed location of the Tabernacle at Shiloh

According to 1 Samuel 1–3, the sanctuary at Shiloh was administered by Eli, the High Priest, and his two sons Hophni and Phinehas. According to this account, the young Samuel was dedicated by his mother Hannah there, to be raised at the shrine by the high priest, and his own prophetic ministry is presented as having begun there. It was under Eli and his sons that the Ark was lost to Israel in a battle with the Philistines at Aphek. W.F. Albright hypothesized that the Philistines also destroyed Shiloh at this time; this conclusion is disputed, but supported by recent archaeological research.

The place may have been destroyed later as well, though the biblical text records no such claimed destruction. Certainly, the shadowy figure of prophet Ahijah the Shilonite, who instigated the revolt of Jeroboam I against David's grandson Rehoboam in 1 Kings 11 and 14, came from there and he bore the same name as the Aaronite priest that consulted the Ark for Saul in 1 Samuel 14:3. Schley has claimed that the capture of the Ark and the death of Saul occurred in the same battle and that the later Davidic editors redacted the texts to make it appear as if Saul had ruled without either Tent Shrine or Ark, and thus without sacral legitimacy.

What is certain is that during the prophetic ministry of Jeremiah in Jeremiah 7:12–15; 26:5–9, and 41:5 over three hundred years later, Shiloh had been reduced to ruins. Jeremiah used the example of Shiloh to warn the inhabitants of Judah and Jerusalem what God would do to the "place where I caused my name to dwell", warning them that their holy city, Jerusalem, like Shiloh, could fall under divine judgment.

According to Richard Elliott Friedman, the priesthood of Shiloh was the Elohist source of the documentary hypothesis and also provided much of the material of the Deuteronomistic history, with the writer of this history (Jeremiah or somebody closely connected to him) being a descendant of these priests. If correct, this would make Shiloh a major source of the history part of the Hebrew Bible/Old Testament.

=== Hellenistic and Roman periods ===
According to historical records, the area's population was diverse on the eve of the Maccabean Revolt in 167 BCE. During the revolt, clashes erupted between the numerous ethnic groups in the vicinity. Several accounts suggest the presence of Edomites in the region; Jewish communities are also implied. Like in western Samaria, it's possible that Seleucid veterans settled here as well. Archeological evidence indicates that Shiloh, then a gentile settlement, was violently destroyed in the mid 2nd century BCE. It was suggested that this destruction might be connected to the conquests of Hasmonean leaders Jonathan Apphus and Simon Thassi.

=== Byzantine period ===
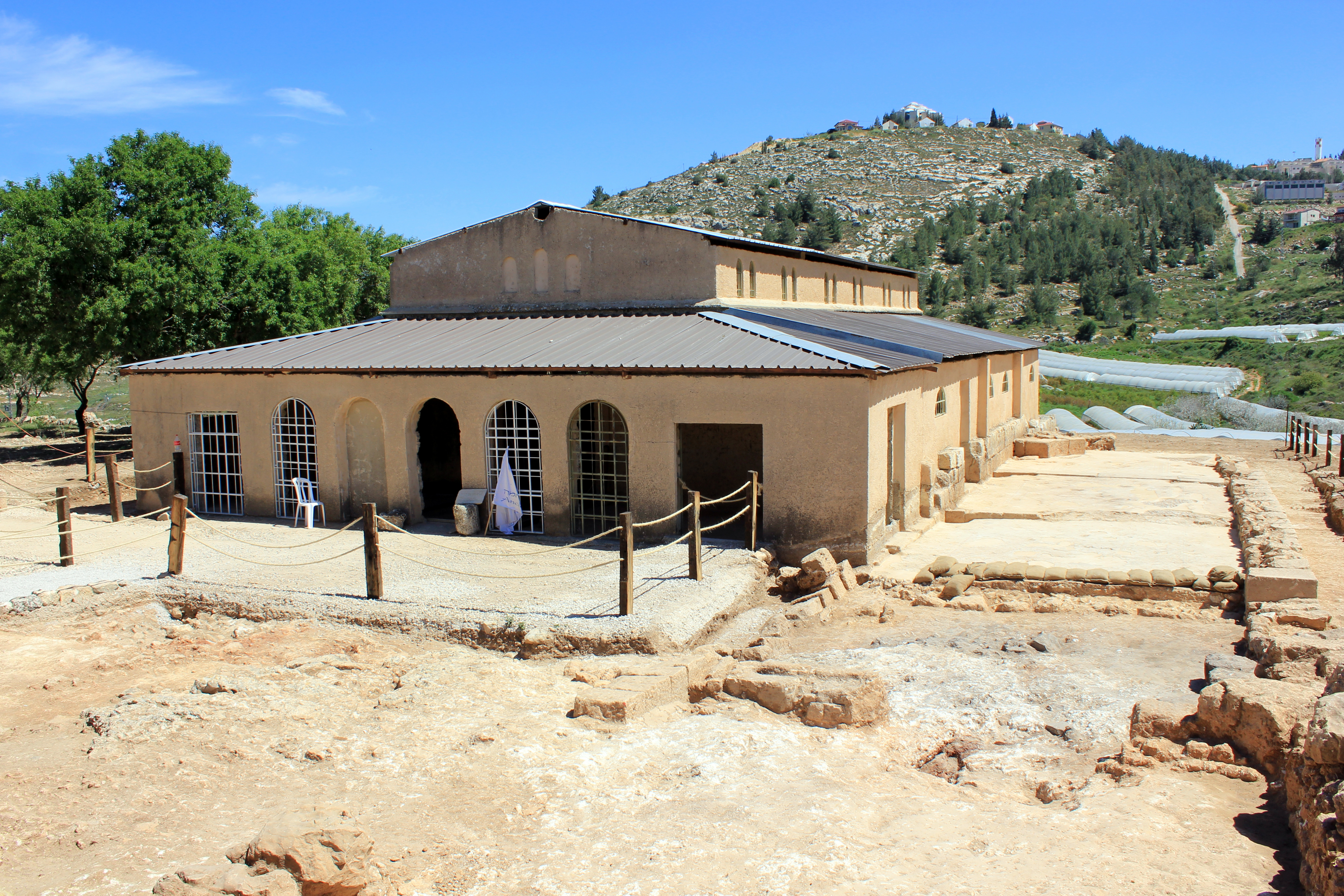
The Byzantine basilica, with excavations to the right.

Jerome, in his letter to Paula and Eustochium, dated about 392–393 CE, writes: "With Christ at our side we shall pass through Shiloh and Bethel " (Ep.46,13, PL 22, 492). The official church of Jerusalem did not schedule an annual pilgrimage to Shiloh, unlike Bethel. On the contrary, Samuel's feast was held on August 20 in the village of Masephta (Mizpah). Even the pilgrims seemingly did not visit Shiloh, for the only one that mentions its name—the sixth-century pilgrim Theodosius in De situ terrae sanctae (ch. 4, CCSL 175, 116)—wrongly locates it midway between Jerusalem and Emmaus Nicopolis. The mistaken identification persisted for centuries, as evident, for example, on the Florentine map of 1300, which places Shiloh at Nabi Samwil, where the Tomb of Samuel is located. The sixth-century mosaic Madaba Map wrongly locates Shiloh east of Shechem, omitting the depiction of the church.

=== Early Muslim and Crusader periods ===
In 638, the Muslims conquered Palestine. Muslim pilgrims to Shiloh mention a mosque called al-Sakina, where the memory of Jacob's and Joseph's deeds was revered. The earliest source is al-Harawi, who visited it in 1173 when it was part of the Crusader state of the Kingdom of Jerusalem, and wrote, "Seilun is the village of the mosque es-Sekineh where the stone of the Table is found". Yaqut (1225) and el-Quarwini (1308, Marmardji, 94–95), write similarly.

== Archaeology ==
=== Overview ===
Archaeological excavations have shown that the place was already settled from about 1750 BCE (Middle Bronze II or MB II, otherwise known as MB IIB according to the Albright school); however, it is not mentioned in any pre-biblical source. A tell and many impressive remains have been unearthed from the Canaanite and Israelite eras, with habitation lasting until the 8th century BCE. During the following 12 centuries Shiloh is solely noted as a station on sojourners' routes, usually having only its religious-historical significance to offer. Archaeological excavations have revealed remains from the Roman and Persian as well as Early and Late Muslim periods.

An impressive glacis has been located and pottery, animal remains, weapons and other objects have been recovered.

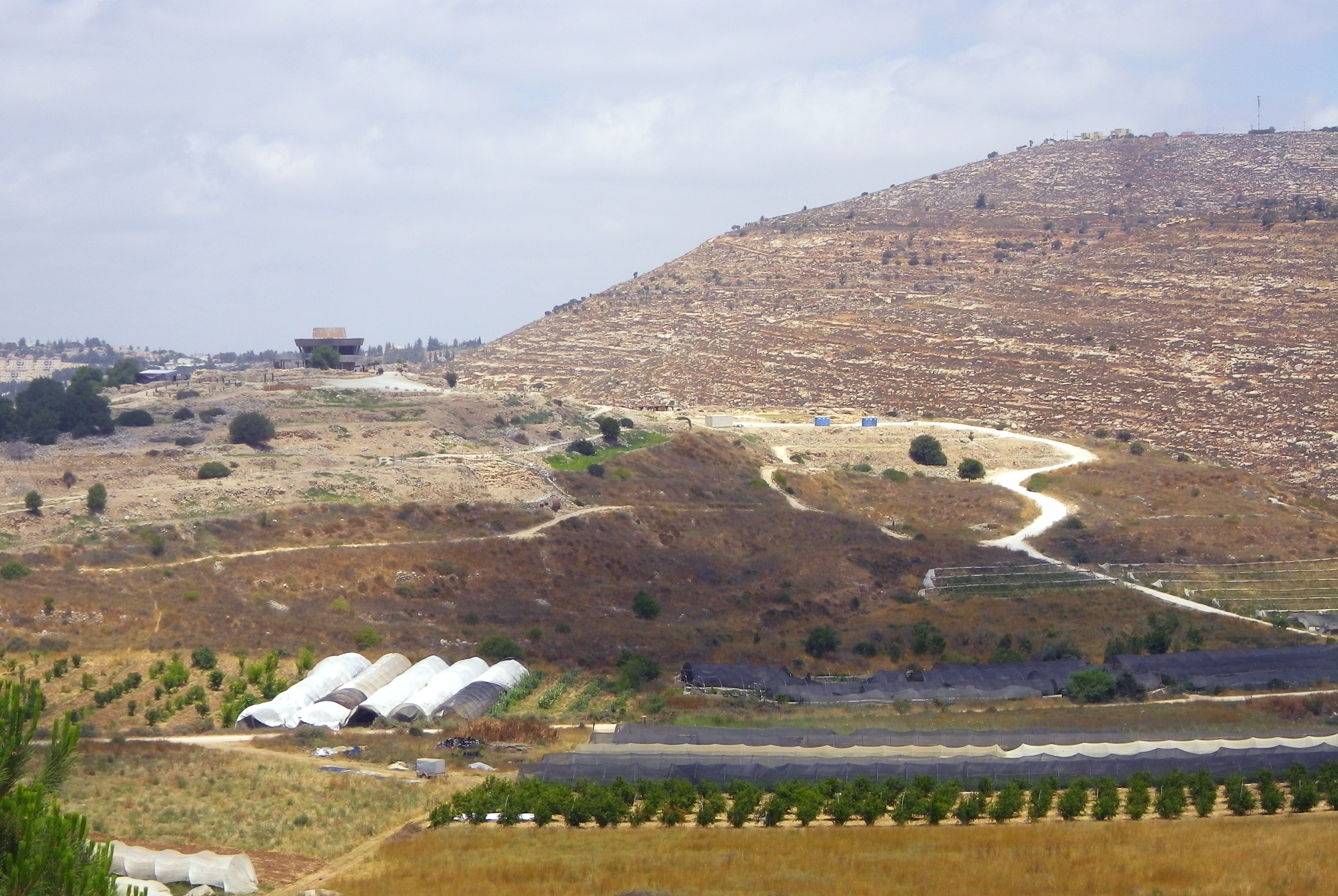
Tel Shiloh visible in the foreground

=== History of excavations ===
Soundings were first made in 1922 by Aage Schmidt. A Danish team led by Hans Kjær (overseen by W.F. Albright) excavated between the years 1926 and 1932. A probe was done by Sven Holm-Nielson and Marie-Louise Buhl in 1963. An extensive excavation was done by Israel Finkelstein during the years 1981–84. Since 2006 further excavations have taken place there. Digs are currently run by Scott Stripling. Under international law an occupying power is not permitted to carry out archaeological excavations except to preserve or rescue a site.

=== Finkelstein excavations ===
Finkelstein's work established eight strata, ranging from Middle Bronze II to the Byzantine period.

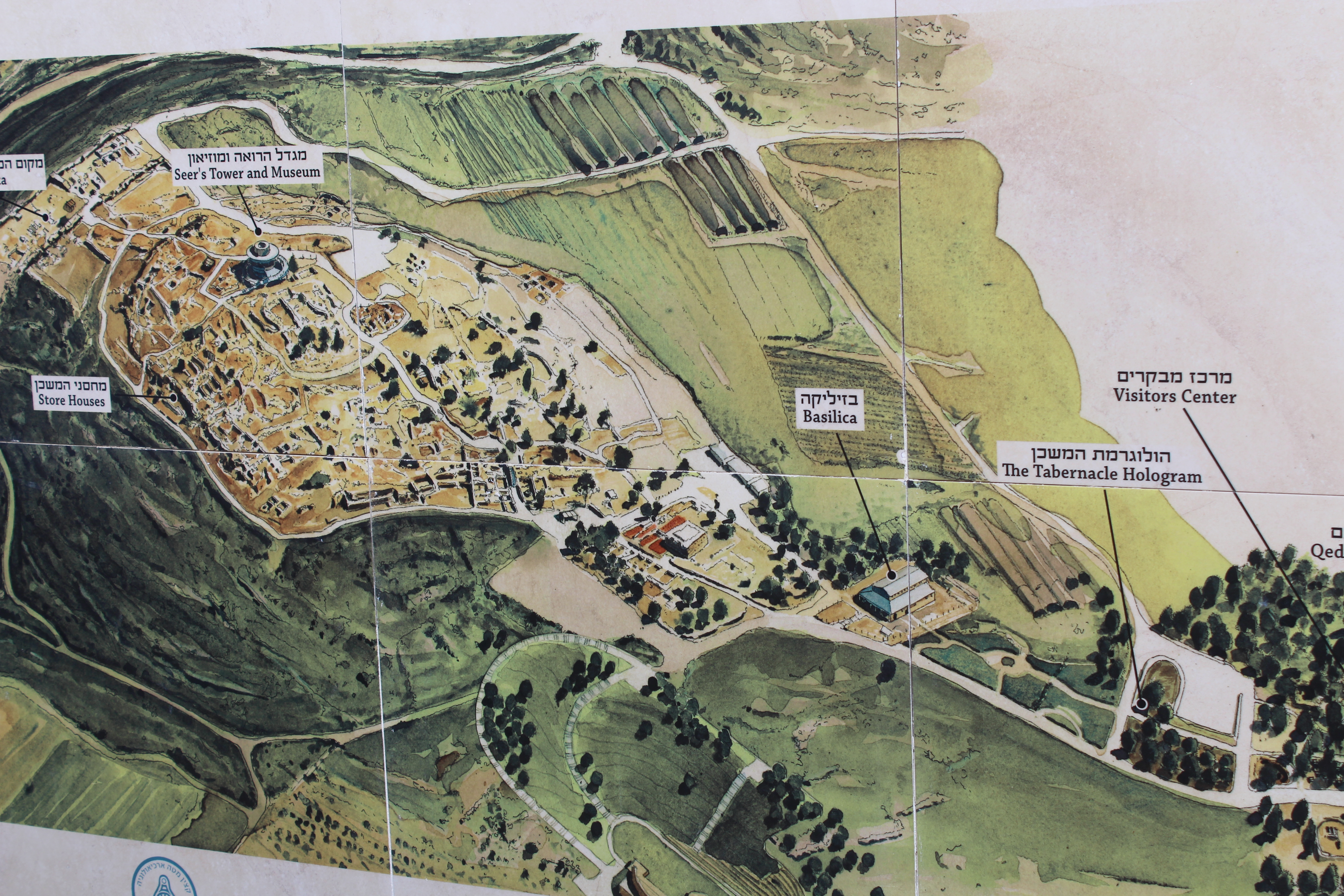
Map of the present-day archaeological site

==== Bronze Age ====
A massive wall is attributed to the Middle Bronze III (MB IIC) stage, preserved at a height of 7.3 metres (24 ft) and width up to 5.5 metres (18 ft), with an extensive glacis.

==== Iron Age ====
The Iron I (Israelite) remains yielded a pillared two-storey public building near the top of the tell, the earliest attributed to Israelites. Collared rim storage jars and some cultic items were found in these buildings, pointing to usage as part of a cultic complex. More than 20 silos were uncovered from this era, included one with carbonized wheat. The destruction layer evident throughout the tell may have occurred in the wake of the Philistine victory at Eben-Ezer.

According to radiocarbon dating by Finkelstein, the site was abandoned around 1050 BCE, and then sparsely repopulated during the Iron II period. Jeremiah's admonition in the course of his temple sermon, "Go now to my place that was in Shiloh" (Jeremiah 7:12), would have occurred during this era.

==== Cultic site ====
One of the more intriguing finds was that of a heap of pottery outside the city wall before the advent of the Israelite culture (c. 1000 BCE). This pile of pottery was the remnant of a number of animal sacrifices, which were tossed over the wall after completion of the ritual and then buried. This find points to a sacral status of Shiloh during the Canaanite period, a status adopted by the Israelites. The top of the tell, where Finkelstein supposes that the tabernacle would have been placed, is now exposed bedrock, offering no clues concerning Israelite worship (aside from the adjacent storage complex).

==== Roman and Byzantine periods ====
More substantive villages emerged in the Roman and Byzantine periods.

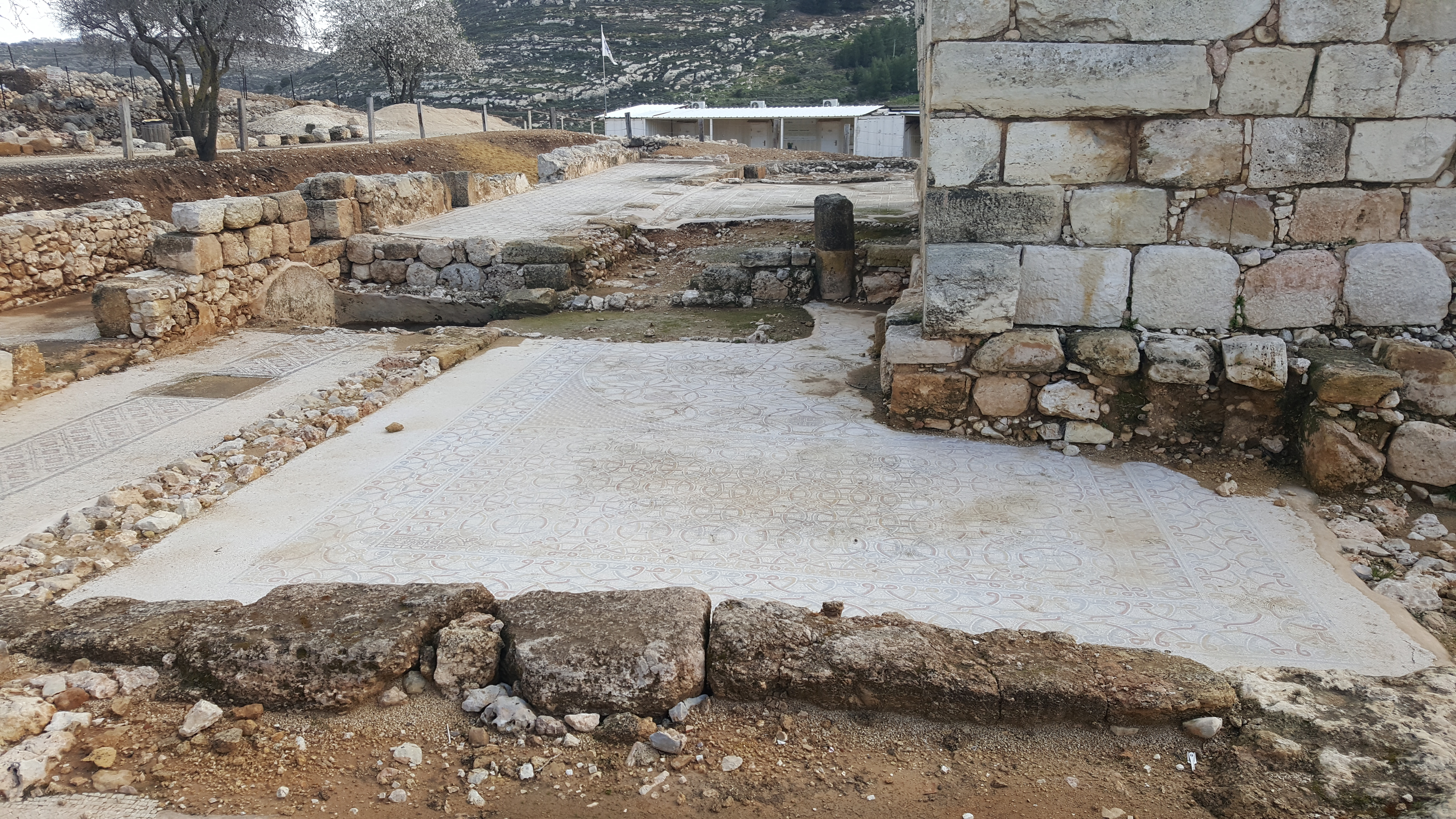
Mosaics under the Jami' al-Yatim

=== Byzantine churches ===
Excavations from 2006 to 2007, carried out adjacent to and just south of Tel Shiloh, exposed elaborate mosaic floors as well as several Greek inscriptions, one explicitly referring to the site as the "village of Shiloh". During August–September 2006 archaeological excavations were carried out adjacent to the tell of Shiloh. A team led by the Archaeological Staff Officer for Judea and Samaria Area in Israel's Civilian Administration Antiquities Unit, performing a clean-up operation at Shiloh this summer, a belated continuation to a previous 1998 dig, discovered the mosaic floor of a large Byzantine church which was probably constructed between 380 and 420.

Three Byzantine basilicas have now been uncovered. The length of one, excavated by Hans Klær in the late 1920s, is 40 metres (130 ft). The width, also measured externally, is 14.10 metres (46.3 ft), but a 6.40-metre (21.0 ft) wide room adjoins the building on the south side. This church had three naves, and 12 bases and two beautiful Corinthian capitals 62 cm (24 in) high and 72–61 cm (28–24 in) wide are preserved. Their appearance recalls the well-known fourth-century style, with separate leaves revealing the ribbing of the back leaves, and a smooth leaf under the corner.

A structure discovered in 2006 lies under a Muslim free-standing structure known as Weli Yetaim. It appears to have experienced problems with water drainage in its western section, despite the installation of runoff pipes and troughs. It appears that the solution was to raise the building's level and lay a new mosaic floor. It was the older, original floor at the lower level that was revealed during the summer of 2006. The mosaic contains geometric designs, a cross, flora representations and three inscriptions, one, a dedication of a bench, the second, a salute to the residents of Siloun (as set in mosaic in uncial script: CIλOYN) and the third, a general wish for good tidings. Another discovery of an addition to one of the basilicas occurred in 2013.

== Ambiguous use of "Shiloh" in Hebrew Bible ==
Shiloh is mentioned in the Hebrew Bible in Genesis as part of the benediction given by Jacob to his son Judah: "The scepter shall not depart from Judah, nor a lawgiver from between his feet, until Shiloh comes, and unto him shall the gathering of the people be." (Genesis 49:10). It could be a figure, perhaps the Messiah, or a place, as mentioned later in Judges and also in Jeremiah 41:5.

=== Messianic Jewish and some Christian interpretations ===
Messianic Judaism became attached to Shiloh as a result of this verse. Shiloh is believed to refer to Jesus by some Christians. Alternative translations have led others, including some Christians, to different conclusions.

== See also ==
- Eben-Ezer
- Nob, Israel
- Song of Moses
