= Seder Olam Zutta =

Anonymous Hebrew chronicle

Seder Olam Zutta (Hebrew: סדר עולם זוטא) is an anonymous chronicle from 803 CE, called "Zuta" (= "smaller," or "younger") to distinguish it from the older Seder Olam Rabbah. This work is based upon, and to a certain extent completes and continues, the older aforementioned chronicle. It consists of two main parts: the first, comprising about three-fifths of the whole, deals with the chronology of the 50 generations from Adam to Jehoiakim, king of Judah (who, according to this chronicle, was the first of the Babylonian exilarch), the second deals with 39 generations of exilarchs, beginning with Jehoiachin and going until the 9th century CE.

== Contents ==
The authorial intention of this work was to demonstrate that the Babylonian exilarchs were direct descendants of David, King of Israel, through a cascading genealogy.

=== From Genesis to the Exile ===
After a short introduction, taken from the Seder Olam Rabbah, giving the general chronology from Adam to the destruction of the Second Temple (a period of 3,828 years) and stating the number of years which elapsed between the most important events (such as between the Flood and the confusion of tongues), the chronology recommences with Adam. Seder Olam Zuta is more complete at this point than Seder Olam Rabbah, as it gives the duration of the generations between Adam and Abraham, which is lacking in the Seder Olam Rabbah. It gives also the lifetime of each of Jacob's twelve sons as recorded by tradition. Otherwise it merely enumerates the generations.

From David onward, it gives the names of the high priests and prophets who lived in the time of each king. Thus, for instance, David had Abiathar as high priest, and Nathan and Gad as prophets; Solomon, who ascended the throne at the age of twelve, had Zadok for high priest, and Jonathan, Iddo, and Ahijah as prophets. In this way it completes the list of the high priests enumerated in I Chronicles. Shallum officiated in the time of Amon, and between Shallum and Azariah (who served in the time of Rehoboam), Seder Olam Zuta lists 12 high priests. But in Chronicles only five high priests are enumerated, whose names are not found at all among those given by the Seder Olam Zuta.

Seder Olam Zuta divides these 50 generations into five series, each of 10 generations. The last persons in each series are, respectively, Noah, Abraham, Boaz, Ahaziah, and Jehoiakim.

=== After the exile ===
The second part of the work begins with the statement that Jehoiachin, who reigned only three months and ten days, was carried into captivity by Nebuchadnezzar. He was afterward given high rank by Evil-merodach, thus becoming the first prince of the Captivity. Correcting the somewhat confused genealogical account of 1 Chronicles 3:17–19, the Seder Olam Zuta declares that Jehoiachin had four sons, the eldest of whom was Shealtiel, who succeeded his father.

Notably, according to this chronicle, Darius conquered Babylon after it had been supreme for 70 years (beginning with the reign of Nebuchadnezzar), and 52 years after the destruction of the First Temple. Zerubbabel, Shealtiel's son, who departed for Jerusalem in the first year of Cyrus' reign, returned to Babylon after the Temple and the walls of Jerusalem had been rebuilt by Ezra, and succeeded his father in the exilarchate.

Then the chronicle enumerates the successive exilarchs, the account being in part taken from I Chronicles but differing greatly from the text of Chronicles. The list given in the text is confabulated in its genealogical descent, such as Shaphat, who is listed as the father of Anan, whose lifetimes extended over a period of more than 600 years, if they are understood to be the characters mentioned in I Chronicles.

With the deaths of Haggai, Zechariah, and Malachi—more exactly, in the 52nd year of the Persian domination, or year 3442 since creation—prophecy ceased and the period of the wise men ("ḥakamim") began. From Hananiah (Zerubbabel's grandson) onward, every exilarch is indicated as having been guided by wise men. The names of the kings that reigned over Judea from Alexander the Great to Roman Palaestina during the destruction of the Second Temple are given. Like the Seder Olam Rabbah, this chronicle gives the reigns of the Maccabees and the Herods as covering 103 years each. The Herodian dynasty consisted, according to the Seder Olam Zuta, of three kings only—Herod, Agrippa, and Monobaz; at the end of Monobaz's reign and during the time of Shechaniah, the son of Shemaiah, the Romans destroyed the Temple. Further, from Nahum the names are given of the wise men, probably the chiefs of the academy, who assisted the exilarchs.

After having stated that Mar-Zutra II (the 13th exilarch) was executed in the year 502 C.E., and that his posthumous son Mar-Zutra III betook himself, in the year 4280 of the Creation (= 520 C.E.), to Palaestina Prima, where he became chief of the Sanhedrin, the chronicle mentions eight succeeding exilarchs, the last one being Rab Ḥaẓub, son of Rab Phinehas. Apart from certain misstatements, this part contains many authenticated facts, and is therefore considered by modern scholars as a document of historical value. It may be seen that the lives of 31 exilarchs covered a period of more than 900 years, averaging three exilarchs to a century. This might help to determine the time at which the Seder Olam Zuta was written, according to this estimate, would have lived at the end of the 8th century. The additions of the copyists, however, render this task difficult.

In a fragment of a chronicle published by A. Neubauer there is a sentence, regarding the reign of John Hyrcanus, which is found in the Seder Olam Zuta but is referred to the "Seder Olam de-Rabbanan." Lazarus supposes that after "de-Rabbanan" the word "Sabura'e" should be inserted, as a chronicle under the title "Seder Olam de-Rabbanan Sabura'e" is mentioned by Baruch b. Isaac of Worms and by Moses of Coucy, in connection with the statement that the year 4564 (= 803/4 C.E.) was a Sabbatical year. This induced many modern scholars, as H. Grätz, Steinschneider, and Zunz, to identify the "Seder Olam Zuta" with the "Seder Olam de Rabbanan Sabura'e."

== Time of redaction ==
As to the determination of the time of its redaction, there have existed many differences of opinion among authorities. Zunz observed that the sentence quoted by R. Baruch and Moses of Coucy with regard to the year 804/3 C.E. (see above) might be the author's colophon—omitted by the copyist—showing the time of composition. Zunz's opinion has since apparently been confirmed by a manuscript of the Seder Olam Zuta which lacks the introduction spoken of above, but has at the end the following sentence: "From Adam to this day, which is the eleventh day of Kislev of the Sabbatical year, 4,564 years have elapsed": this gives November 803 C.E. However, a closer examination of the text seems to show that the enumeration of the eight exilarchs following Mar-Zutra III was added by two later hands—that of six by one, and that of two, Phinehas and Hazub, by another—and that the chronicle was composed in the first quarter of the 6th century.

For the editions and Latin translations of the Seder Olam Zutta, see Seder Olam Rabbah. Abraham Zacuto inserted in his Yuḥasin the greater part of Seder Olam Zutta, his text being more nearly correct than that of any other edition or manuscript. Zacuto's text was republished by A. Neubauer, where the text of the Mantua edition also is given. The second part, dealing with the exilarchs, has been edited by Lazarus.

Recent scholarship ascribes authorship to the 10th-century Nathan ben Isaac HaBabli.
