= Amram (disambiguation) =

Amram is a biblical character.

Amram may also refer to:

== People ==
=== Given name ===
- Amram of Mainz, legendary medieval German rabbi
- Amram Aburbeh, Sephardi chief rabbi of Petah Tikva, Israel
- Amram Blau
- Amram Ducovny
- Amram Gaon, 9th-century Jewish Babylonian sage
- Amram Mitzna
- Amram Nowak – American filmmaker
- Amram Qorah
- Amram Taub
- Amram Zaks, Israeli rabbi
- Amram Zur
- Amram ben Diwan
- Amram ben Yitzhaq, 124th Samaritan High Priest, Israel
- Amram ben Sheshna
- Amram ibn Salameh
- Amram of Mainz

=== Surname ===
- David Werner Amram (1866-1939), American lawyer and legal scholar
- Philip Werner Amram (1900-1990), American lawyer and legal scholar
- Itubwa Amram (1922-1989), Nauruan pastor and politician
- David Amram (born 1930), an American composer and conductor
- Aharon Amram (born 1939), Israeli musician and poet
- Ofir Amram (born 1986), Israeli footballer
- Megan Amram (born 1987), American comedian and writer

== See also ==
- Visions of Amram, fragmentary manuscripts
- Imran, the equivalent Arabic name
- AIM-120 AMRAAM, an air-to-air guided missile
