= Asher ben Matzliach ben Phinhas =

125th Samaritan High Priest (1980–1982)

Asher ben Matzliach ben Phinhas was the 125th Samaritan High Priest from 1980 to 1982. He was the son of Matzliach ben Phinhas ben Yitzhaq ben Shalma, and the nephew of Abisha III ben Phinhas ben Yittzhaq ben Shalma. In 1982 he was succeeded by his brother Phinehas X ben Matzliach ben Phinehas. His son became high priest Aabed-El ben Asher ben Matzliach.

Preceded by Amram IX ben Yitzhaq ben Amram ben Shalma	Samaritan High Priest	Succeeded by Phinehas X ben Matzliach ben Phinehas
