= Samaritan High Priest =

High priest of the Samaritan community

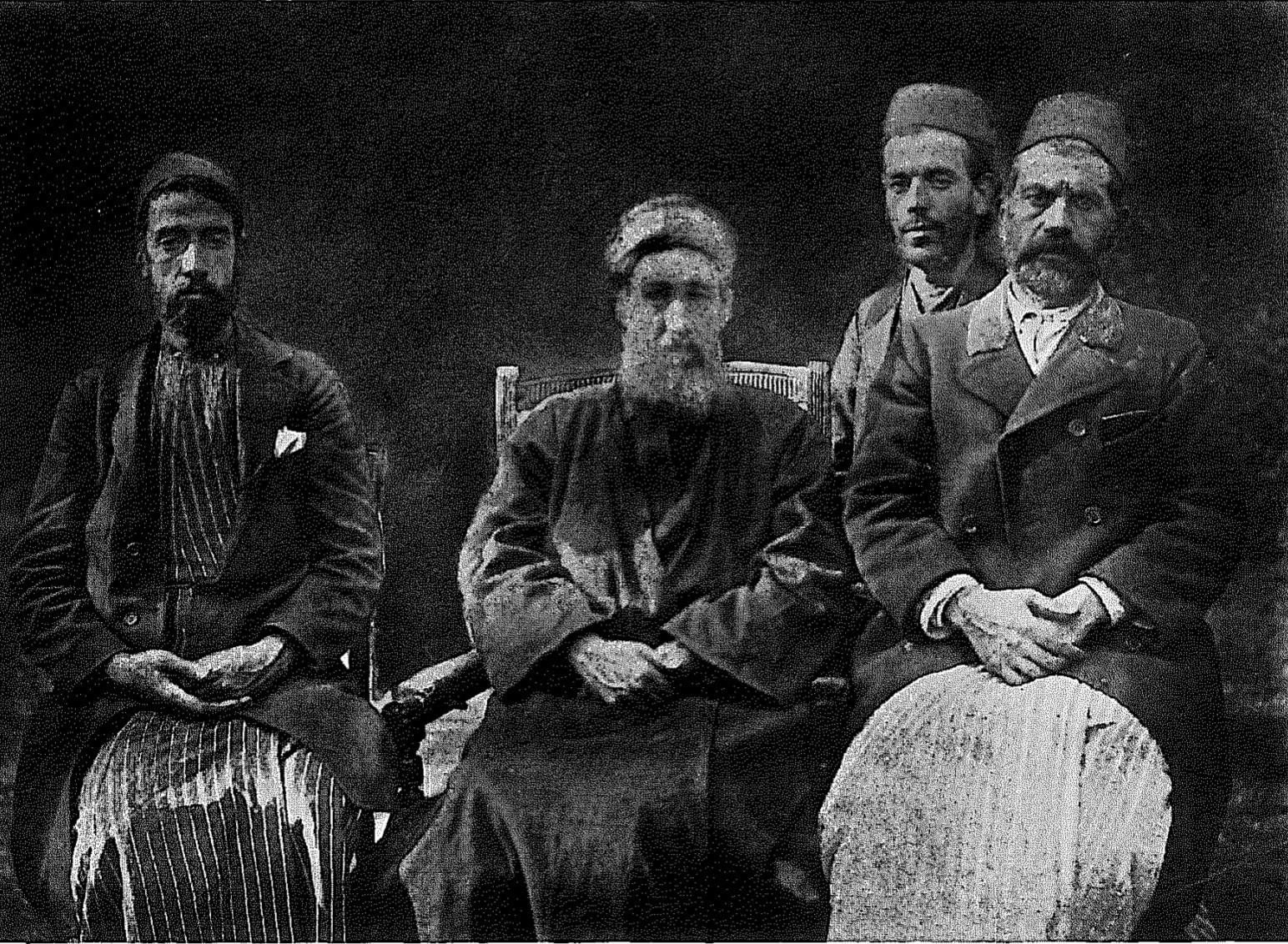
Family of the Samaritan High Priests, 1876. To the left is a scribe named Shalabi, to the right are Isaac, the son of the High Priest Amram ben Shalma, then Abisha, the son of Amram's brother Fīnās, and finally ʿUzzi, son of the High Priest Yaʿqob ben Aharon ben Shalma, the son of Amram's brother Aharon.

The Samaritan High Priest (Samaritan Hebrew: ࠄࠊࠄࠍ ࠄࠂࠃࠅࠋ ak-Kāʾen ag-gādol; Arabic: الكاهن الأكبر al-Kāhin al-Akbar) is the High Priest of Israel for the Samaritans.

According to Samaritan tradition, the office has existed continuously since the time of Aaron, the brother of Moses, and has been held by 133 priests over the last 3400 years. However, the historicity of this claim is disputed. One account by Josephus suggests that its office holders are an offshoot of the Zadokite High Priests of the Second Temple from around the time of Alexander the Great. As of 2025, the incumbent High Priest is Aabed-El ben Asher ben Matzliach.

== Office of the High Priest ==
=== Duties and responsibilities ===
The Samaritan High Priest has the following duties in the present:

1. He decides all religious law issues.
2. He presides over the religious ceremonies on Mount Garizim.
3. He validates all marriages and divorces within the Samaritan community.
4. He annually publishes the liturgical calendar of the Samaritans.
5. He confirms a joining of the Samaritan community.
6. He appoints the Cantors and the Shechita of the community.
7. He represents the Samaritan community to the outside world.

=== Lineage ===
Since 1623/24, the office of high priest has been passed down in a family traced back to Aaron's grandson Itamar. After the death of a high priest, the office passes to the oldest male in that family, unless he has entered into a marriage that disqualifies him from the high priesthood.

It appears, based upon the larger gaps in time between high priests, that several names might be missing, or that there were long periods of vacancy between priests.

The continuous lineage of Samaritan High Priests, descending directly from Aaron, through his son Eleazar, and his son Phinehas, was however disrupted in the early 17th century. In 1624, Shalma I ben Phinehas, the last Samaritan High Priest of the line of Eleazar son of Aaron died without male succession, but descendants of Aaron's other son, Ithamar, remained and took over the office.

There are four families within the house of Ithamar. The Åbtå order, descended from the 113th High Priest Tsedaka ben Tabia, which has held the office of the High Priesthood since 1624; the House of Phineas a.k.a. Dār 'Åder, descended from Fīn'ās ban Yīṣ'å̄q (Phineas ben Isaac); Dār Yīṣ'å̄q, descended from Yīṣ'å̄q ban Åmrām (Isaac ben Amram); and Dār Yāqob, descended from Yāqob ban Årron (Jacob ben Aaron).

Photographs of Samaritan High Priests
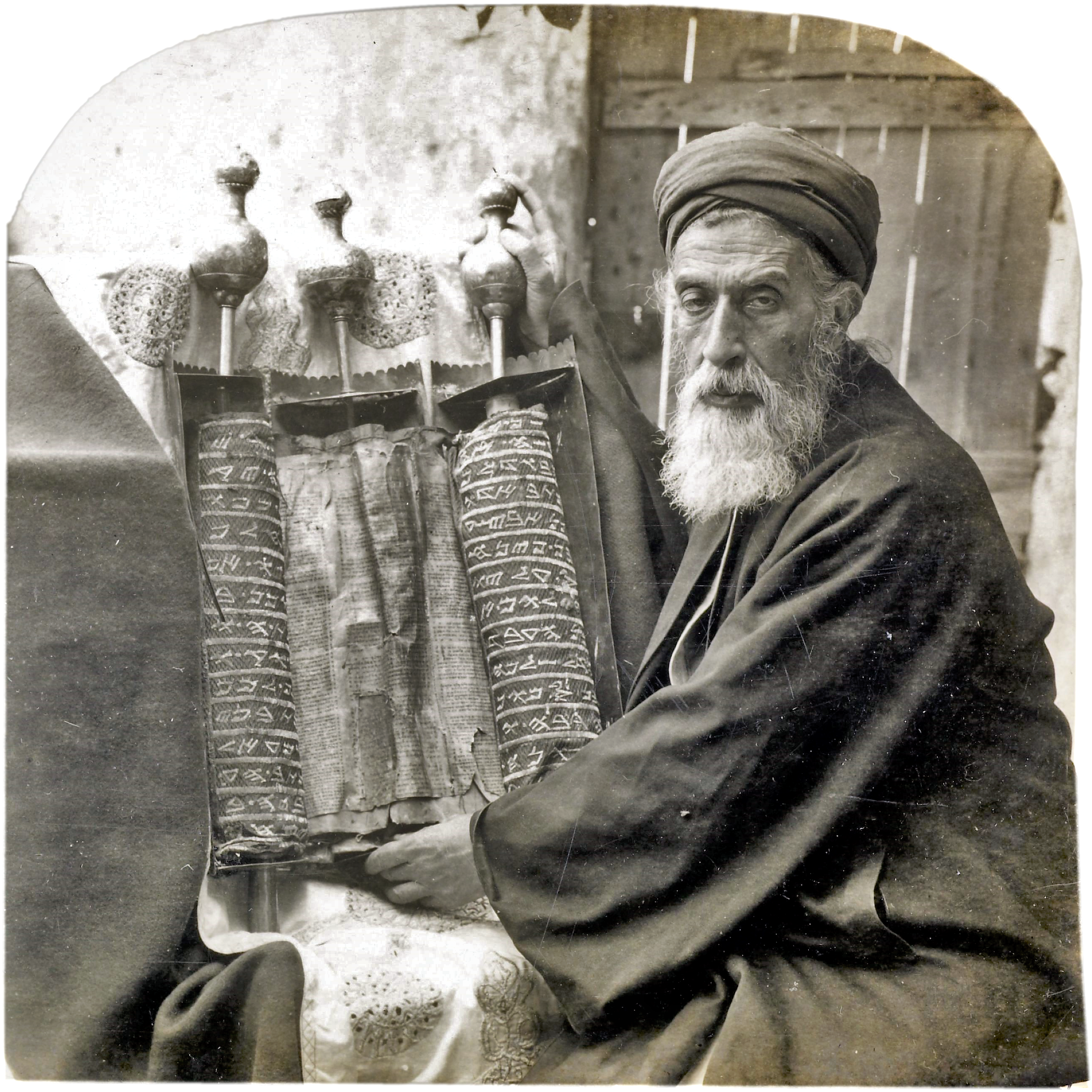
Jacob I

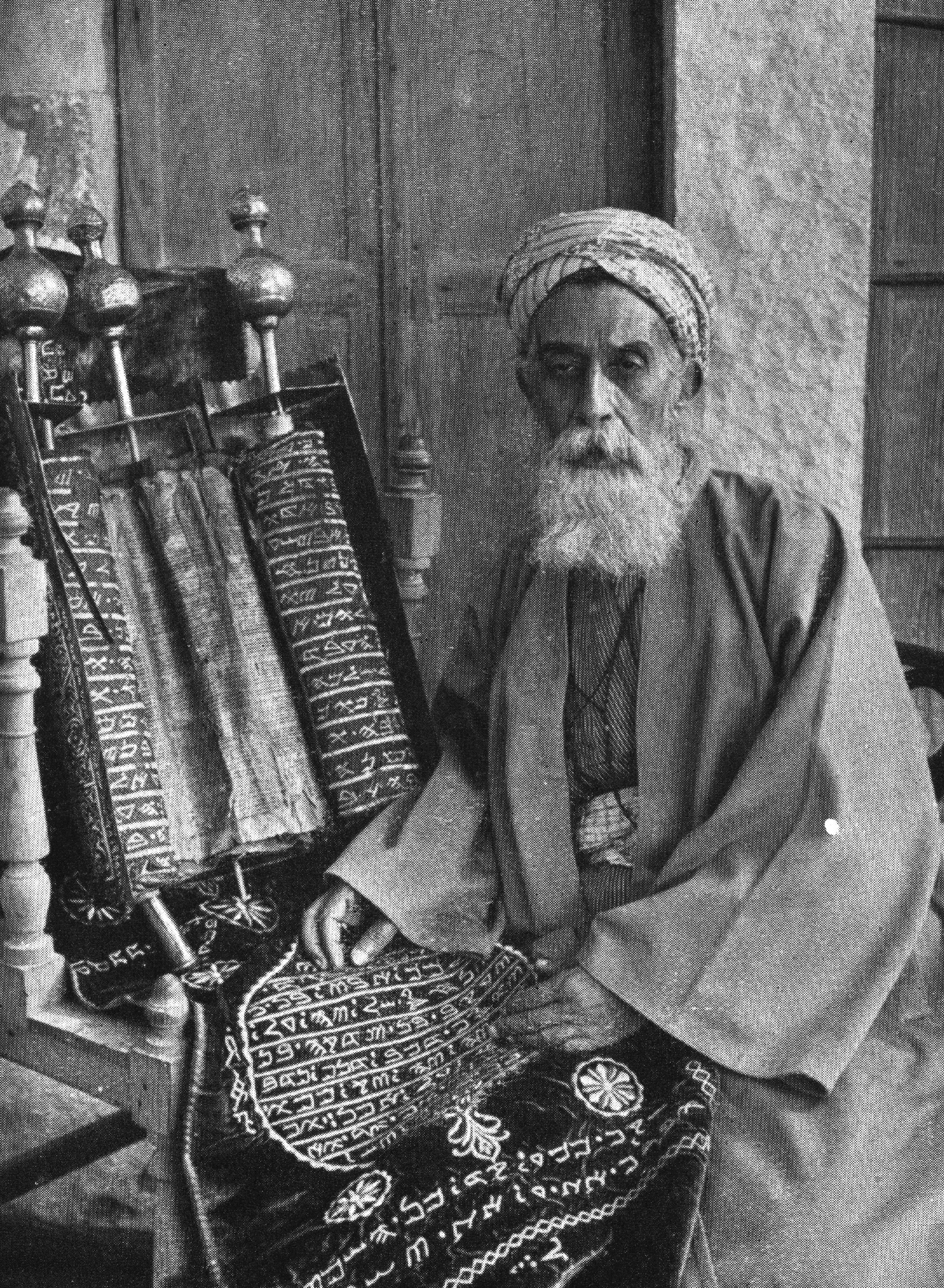
Jacob I

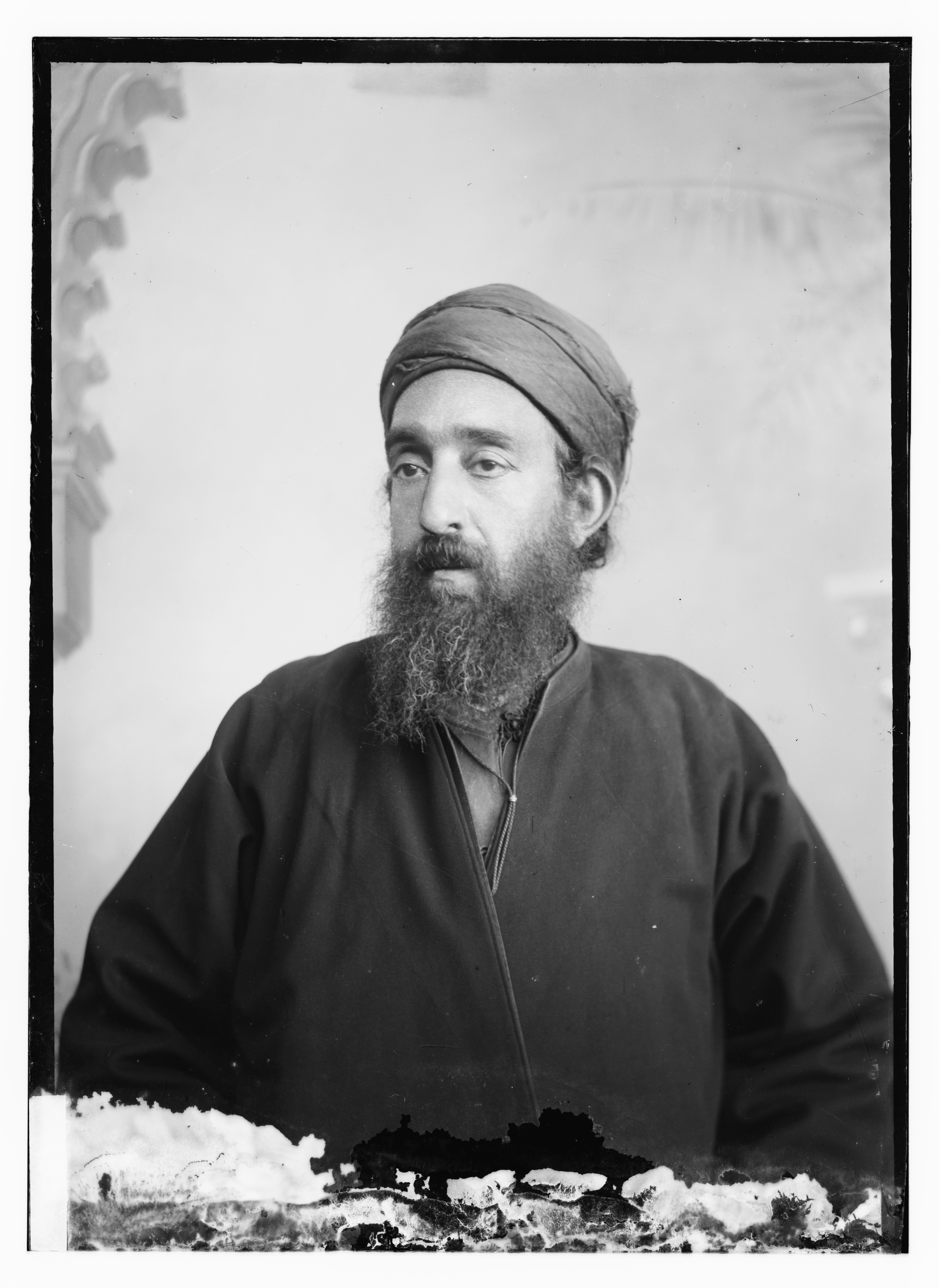
Maṣliaḥ (or Abishah III)

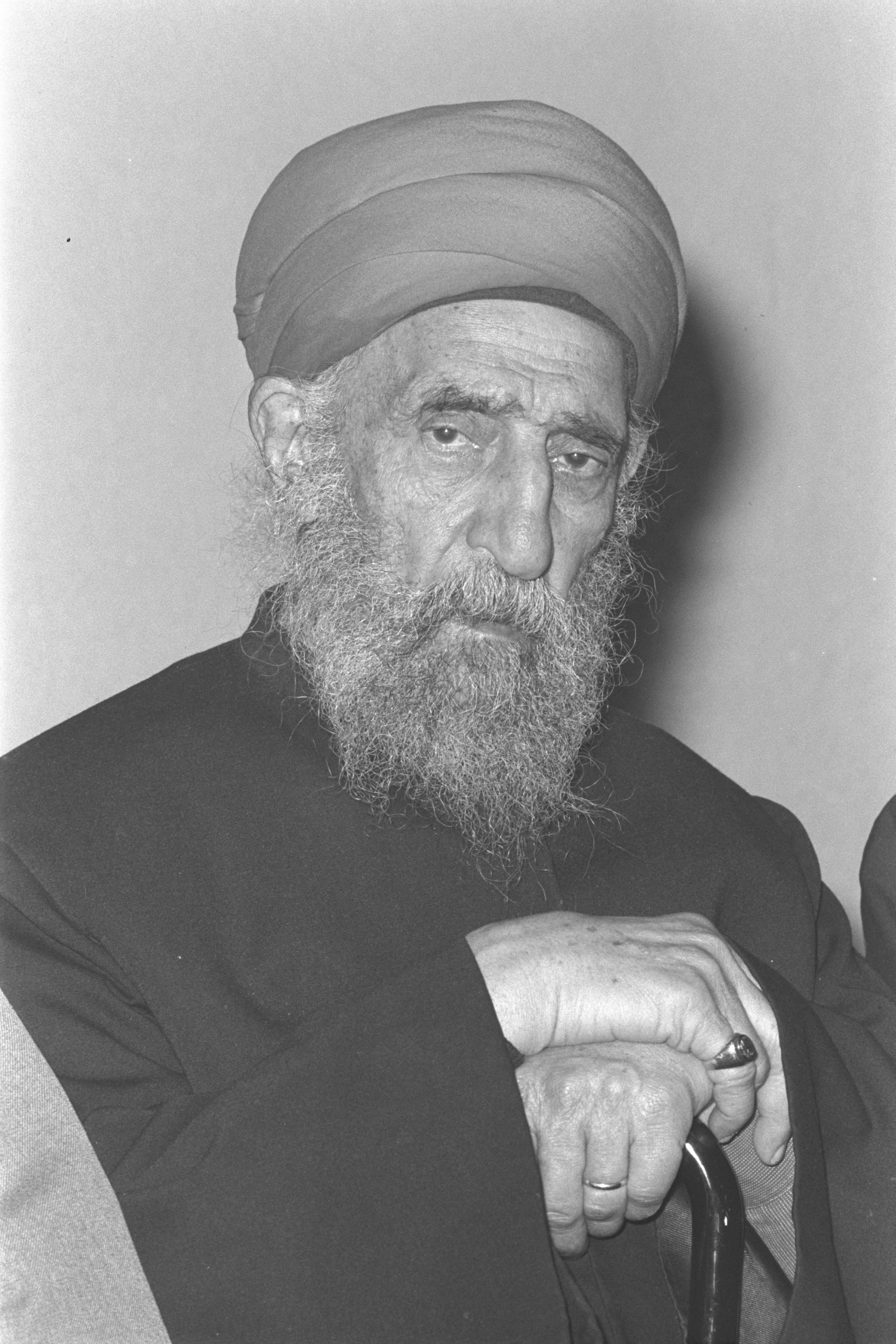
Amram IX

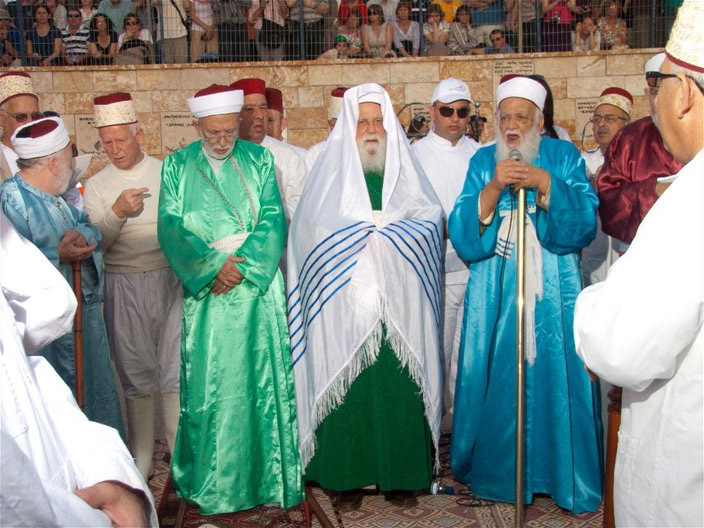
Aaron IV

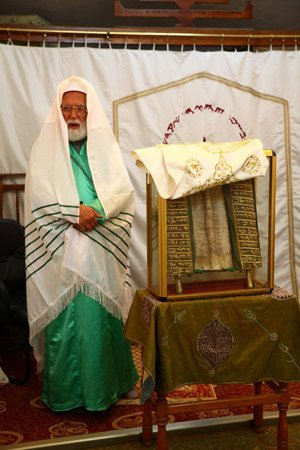
Abdel V

== List of Samaritan High Priests ==
=== Pummer's list ===
The following list gives the names and terms of office according to Reinhard Pummer. Pummer uses a spelling for the name of the high priest that is based on the English Bible for the bearers of biblical names, while he chooses a more scientific transcription for the full name (last column). The traditional counting begins with the first post-biblical high priest Sheshai. It differs in order in some cases from the list prepared by Moses Gaster on the basis of the ancient Samaritan sources, and includes additional names (italics here).

Traditional Numbering	High Priest Name	Term	Comments	Civil name and life data
	Aaron I (אהרן)		Biblical figure, brother of Moses. He is considered in the Torah to be the "ancestor of the legitimate Levitical-Aaronid priesthood."	
	Eleazar I (אלעזר)		Biblical figure, son of Aaron and his successor as high priest.	
	Phinehas I (פינחס)		Biblical figure, son of Eleazar. Because of his religious "zeal" he and his descendants are awarded a perpetual priesthood.	
	Abishua I (אבישע)		According to Samaritan tradition, Aaron's great-grandson is said to have written down a Pentateuch scroll that is first mentioned by Abū l'Fatḥ in the 14th century and, in a very poor state of preservation, is kept by the Samaritan community as a precious possession. The Abisha Scroll is considered the original of all Samaritan Torah scrolls.	
1	Sashai ben Abishua			
2	Bakhi ben Sashai		probably identical to the Jewish High Priest Bukki	
3	Uzzi ben Sashai		According to Samaritan tradition, Uzzi hid the tent sanctuary of the desert migration (Mishkan) in a cave at Garizim when the Israelites introduced the cult at Shiloh, which was illegitimate from the Samaritan point of view.	
4	Shashai II ben Uzzi			
5	Bakhi II ben Sashai			
6	Shembet ben Bakhi		who served at the shrine to God at Shechem alone	
7	Shalom I ben Shembet			
8	Hezekiah I ben Shalom			
9	Jonathan I ben Abiathar (ben Hezekiah?)		According to Samaritan tradition, he is said to have been a contemporary of King David. (2 Samuel 15:27), served as a messenger during Absalom's rebellion (2 Samuel 15:36, 17:17)	
10	Jair I ben Jonathan			
11	Daliah I			
12	Jair II ben Daliah		In his time the Jerusalem temple is said to have been built.	
13	Jonathan II ben Jair			
14	Ishmael ben Jonathan			
15	Tabia I		This high priest is said to have been murdered by the Ishmaelites.	
16	Zedekiah I			
17	Ahid			
18	Jair III			
19	Jehozadak			
20	Zadok (צדוק)			
21	Amram I (עמרם)			
22	Hilkiah or Hezekiah II			
23	Amram II (עמרם)			
24	Akkub			
25	Akkubiah I		According to the Samaritan chronicler Abū l'Fatḥ (14th century), Aqabiah was a contemporary of Nebuchadnezzar II and thus of the conquest of Jerusalem by the Babylonians (587 B.C.). He is said to have been led into Babylonian exile with the Israelites.	
26	Hillel I			
27	Seriah		He is said to have returned with his people from exile.	
28	Levi I (לוי)			
29	Netaniel I			
30	Azariah		In the 10th year of his high priesthood he is said to have been captured by the Chaldeans.	
31	Aabed-El I		This high priest returned from exile; in his time the Samaritan community is said to have had 300,000 members.	
32	Hezekiah III			
33	Hananiah			
34	Amram III (עמרם)		His son is said to have married the daughter of King "Derus"; according to tradition, the Samaritans made a riot and killed both of them.	
35	Hillel II/Hanan		This high priest is said to have married the daughter of the king of Assyria and to have been killed by the Samaritans.	
36	Hezekiah IV		According to the Samaritan historian Abū l'Fatḥ, Hezekiah was high priest when Alexander III of Macedonia defeated the Persian king Darius.	
37	Daliah II			
38	Akkub II			
39	Akkubiah II			
40	Levi II (לוי)			
41	Eleazar II			
42	Manasseh		the son-in-law of Sanballat the Horonite	
43	Jair IV			
44	Netaniel II			
45	Joachim	c. 4 BCE	According to Samaritan tradition, Jesus of Nazareth was born during the tenure of Jehoiakim.	
46	Jonathan III	c. 29 CE	In his time Jesus is said to have been killed "in the cursed Shalem" (= Jerusalem).	
47	Elishama			
48	Shemaiah			
49	Tabia II			
50	Amram IV (עמרם)			
51	Akabon I			
52	Phinehas II			
53	Levi III (לוי)	early 2nd century	Emperor Hadrian (r. 117–138 CE) is said to have shown special favors to the Samaritans in the time of the high priest Levi III.	
54	Eleazar III			
55	Baba I (בבא)			
56	Eleazar IV			
57	Akabon II			
58	Netaniel III			
59	Baba II Rabba	c. 308– 328	The Samaritan reformer Baba Rabba was a historical figure (early 4th century CE). He organized synagogue construction, worship and community structure.	
60	Akabon III			
61	Netaniel IV		This high priest is said to have burned his maid at the stake because she fell in love with his son.	
62	Akabon IV			
63	Eleazar V			
64	Akabon V			
65	Eleazar VI			
66	Akabon VI	late 6th century		
67	Eleazar VII			
68	Netaniel V	early 7th century	He is said to have been a contemporary of the "cursed king Zinon."	
69	Eleazar VIII	c. 630	Abū l'Fatḥ said Muhammad lived during his tenure.	
70	Netaniel VI			
71	Eleazar IX			
72	Akabon VII		This high priest was drowned in the Jordan River according to tradition.	
73	Eleazar X			
74	Akabon VIII			
75	Eleazar XI			
76	Akabon IX			
77	Eleazar XII			
78	Simeon (שמעון)		In his time, "Karozai the King of Assur" (perhaps the Sassanid ruler Khosrow I or II) is said to have enlisted many Samaritans as soldiers. The Byzantine emperor Heraclius conquered the Holy Land. Then the Ishmaelites came and conquered all the cities, and the inhabitants of Caesarea Maritima were led into captivity.	
79	Levi IV (לוי)			
80	Phinehas III			
81	Netaniel VII (נתנאל)			
82	Baba III (בבא)			
83	Eleazar XIII			
84	Netaniel VIII			
85	Eleazar XIV			
86	Phinehas IV			
87	Netaniel IX			
88	Aabed-El II			
89	Eleazar XV			
90	Aabed-El III			
91	Eleazar XVI			
92	Aabed-El IV		Here there are discrepancies Eleazar, his son Abdeel and his brother Aaron are said to have officiated together as high priests for 69 years, but not in Shechem, but in Damascus.	
93	Aaron II (אהרן)			
95	Tsedaka I			
96	Amram V (עמרם)			
97	Aaron III (אהרן)		In his time the Samaritan synagogue of Shechem was built.	
98	Amram VI (עמרם)			
99	Uzzi II		In his time, the Muslims took away from the Samaritans their synagogue and the "piece of land" in Shechem.	
100	Joseph I (יוסף)		This high priest also came from Damascus.	
101	Phinehas V		His son Raban Abishah composed liturgical chants.	Pinḥas ben Josef, der Sohn des Vorigen.
102	Eleazar XVII (אלעזר)	1362/63–1387		Eleazar ben Pinḥas ben Josef
103	Phinehas VI haNatzri (פינחס)		This high priest was the son of the hymn writer Raban Abishah.	Pinḥas ben Abisha ben Pinḥas ben Josef
104	Abishua II (אבישע)			Abisha ben Pinḥas ben Abisha; Sohn des Vorigen.
105	Eleazar XVIII (אלעזר)			Eleazar ben Abisha ben Pinḥas
106	Itamar (איתמר)		The high priest Itamar ben Aaron ben Itamar in Damascus was one of the scribes of a Pentateuch codex (Ms. London, British Library, Cotton Claudius B. viii).	
107	Amram VII (עמרם)		In his time Samaria was conquered and many Samaritans were captured and taken to Damascus, but the Samaritan community in Damascus bought them free.	
108	Uzzi III			
109	Phinehas VII (פינחס)		In 1516, Ottoman rule began in Palestine. The total number of Samaritans at that time is given as 500 people who lived in Cairo, Gaza and Damascus in addition to Nablus. The census of 1538/39 mentions 29 Samaritan households in Nablus, from which a number of 178 persons can be estimated.	Pinḥas ben Eleazar
110	Eleazar XIX (אלעזר)	1549–1595/96	In his time a ritual bath was built for the Samaritans in Shechem.	Eleazar ben Pinḥas
111	Phinehas VIII (פינחס)	1595/96–1614/15		Pinḥas ben Eleazar
112	Shalma I ben Phinehas	1614/15–1623/24	With Shelemya, who was murdered, ended the original high priestly dynasty, which traced itself back to Phinehas, the grandson of Aaron. Centuries later, the Samaritan community was still researching whether there might have been members of the Phinehas dynasty living in Europe.	Shelemia ben Pinḥas
113	Tsedaka II ben Tabia ha'Åbtå'i	1623/24–1650	Ṣadaqa II was the first high priest from the family that has been in office since then, tracing back to Itamar, the brother of Elazar. This family was considered Levitical until then; since it was the only surviving Levitical family, Levitical and Aaronid descent has been synonymous among the Samaritans since then.	Ṣadaqa ben Ṭabia Halevi
114	Yitzhaq I ben Tsedaka	1650–1694		Jiṣḥaq ben Ṣadaqa
115	Abram ben Yitzhaq	1694–1732		Abraham ben Jiṣḥaq ben Ṣadaqa
116	Levi V ben Abram	1733–1752		Levi ben Abraham
117	Tabia III ben Yitzhaq ben Abram	1752–1787	This high priest settled in the Samaritan community in Gaza.	Ṭabia ben Jiṣḥaq
118	Shalma II ben Tabia	1798–1828	Salama was four years old at his father's death and the only surviving member of the high priestly family. He assumed the office of high priest at the age of 15. In 1810 he sent a letter to the French senator Henri Grégoire, in which he lamented the distressed situation of the Samaritans. Since 1785 it was no longer possible to offer the Passover sacrifice on the Garizim; it had to take place in the city.	Salama ben Ṭabia ben Jiṣḥaq (1784–1855)
119	Amram VIII ben Shalma	1828–1859/60	In 1832 the pilgrimages to Mount Garizim could be resumed. In the 1840s, Muslim ulama demanded that all Samaritans be forcibly converted to Islam because they did not belong to any book religion. The Sephardic chief rabbi of Jerusalem produced an expert opinion that the Samaritans belonged to the people of Israel and lived according to the Torah. This (together with a gift of money) averted the danger from the Samaritan community. Upon British intervention, the Passover sacrifice on Mount Garizim was again permitted by the Ottoman authorities in 1849.	
120	Yaacob I ben Aaharon ben Shalma	1859/60–1916	Jacob I promoted the opening to the West and to the Jewish community, seeing opportunities for the small Samaritan community in the interest of the world public.	Jaaqob ben Aharon ben Salama (1840/41–1916)
121	Yitzhaq II ben Amram ben Shalma ben Tabia (יצחק)	1917/18–1932		Jiṣḥaq ben Amram ben Salama (1855–1932)
122	Matzliach ben Phinehas ben Yitzhaq ben Shalma (מצליח)	1933–1943		Maṣliaḥ ben Pinḥas ben Jiṣḥaq ben Salama (1868–1943)
123	Abisha III ben Phinehas ben Yitzhaq ben Shalma (אבישע)	1943–1960	Brother of Matzliach	Abisha ben Pinḥas ben Jiṣḥaq ben Salama (1880–1960)
124	Amram IX ben Yitzhaq ben Amram ben Shalma (עמרם)	1960–1980		Amram ben Jiṣḥaq ben Amram ben Salama (1889–1980)
125	Asher ben Matzliach ben Phinehas (אשר)	1980–1982		Asher ben Maṣliaḥ ben Pinḥas (1895–1982)
126	Phinehas X ben Matzliach ben Phinehas (פינחס)	1982–1984	Brother of Asher	Pinḥas ben Maṣliaḥ (1899–1984)
127	Yaacob II ben Uzzi ben Yaacob ben Aaharon - Abu Shafi (יעקב)	1984–1987	A highly respected High Priest, grandson of Yaacob I ben Aaharon ben Shalma.	Jaaqob ben Azi ben Jaaqob (1900–1987)
128	Yoseph II ben Ab-Hisda ben Yaacov ben Aaharon (יוסף)	1987–1998		Josef ben Ab Ḥisda ben Jaaqob (1919–1998)
129	Levi VI ben Abisha ben Phinehas ben Yitzhaq (לוי)	1998–2001		Levi ben Abisha (1920–2001)
130	Shalom II ben Amram ben Yitzhaq/Salum Is'haq al-Samiri (שלום)	2001–2004		Shalom ben Amram (13. Januar 1922–9. Februar 2004)
131	Elazar XX ben Tsedaka ben Yitzhaq (אלעזר)	2004–2010		Eleazar ben Ṣedaqah ben Jiṣḥaq (16. Januar 1927–3. Februar 2010)
132	Aharon IV ben Ab-Chisda ben Yaacob (אהרן)	2010–2013	Brother of High Priest Josef II.	Aharon ben Ab-Ḥisdah ben Jaaqob ben Aharon (1. Februar 1927–19. April 2013)
133	Aabed-El V ben Asher ben Matzliach (עבדאל)	2013–		Abdel ben Asher ben Maṣliaḥ (* 1935)

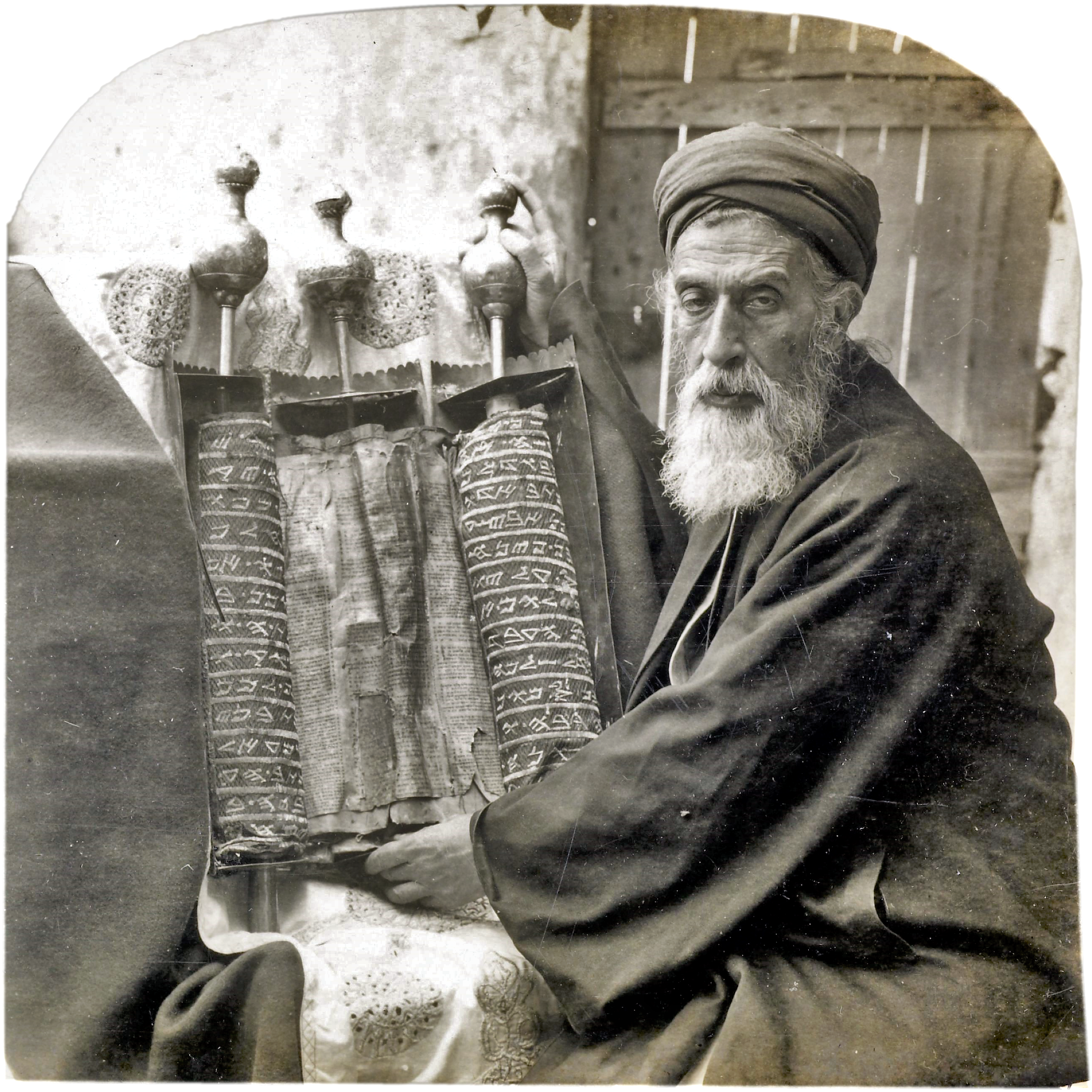
Samaritan High Priest Yaakov ben Aharon and the Abisha Scroll, 1905

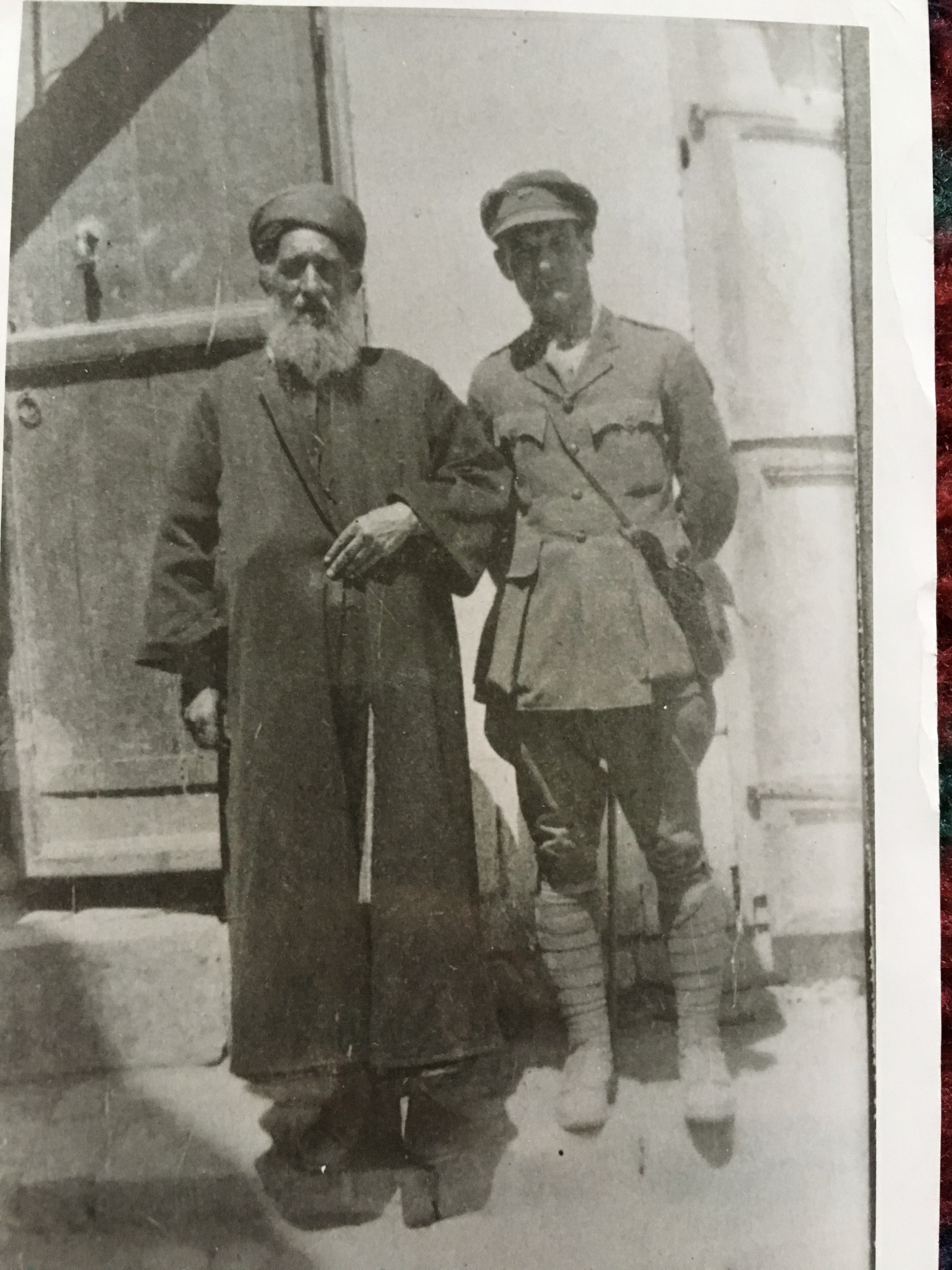
Yitzhaq ben Amram ben Shalma ben Tabia, Samaritan High Priest, taking refuge from riots on Easter 1920 with Dr. A.C. Harte, Director of Jerusalem YMCA.

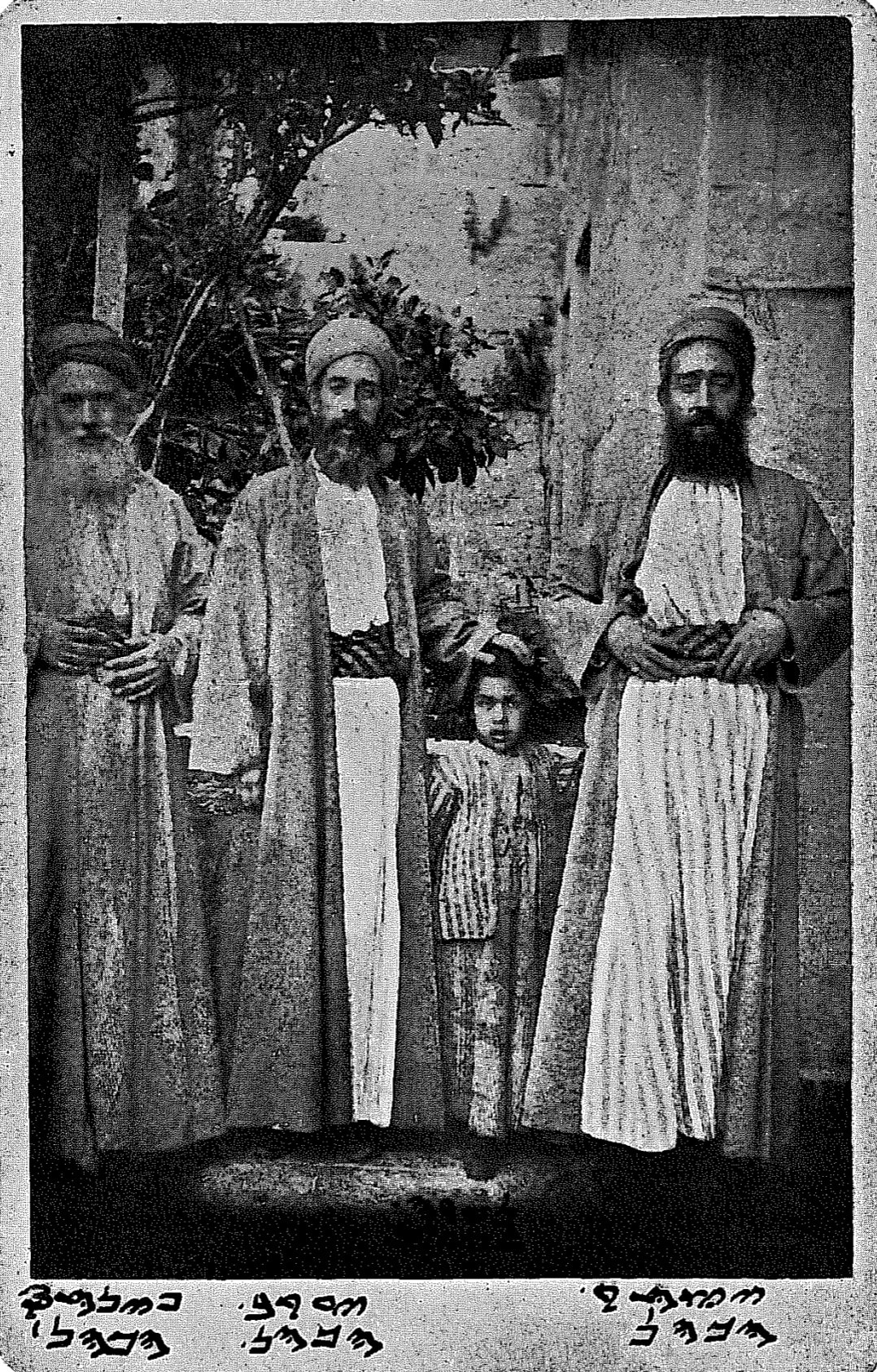
Samaritan Kohanim c. 1876. The inscription on the bottom label the persons from, left to right: "Phineas the Kohen, Jacob the Kohen, Isaac the Kohen". The small child is Jacob's daughter.

=== Moses Gaster's list ===
Moses Gaster, in his 1909 article The Chain of Samaritan High Priests: A Synchronistic Synopsis: Published for the First Time, published a slightly different order which he translated from two codices written by the High Priests:

1. Sashai I
2. Bakhi I
3. Uzzi
4. Sashai II
5. Bakhi II
6. Shembet
7. Shalom I
8. Hezekiah I
9. Jonathan I
10. Daliah I
11. Jair II
12. Jonathan II
13. Ishmael
14. Tabia I
15. Zadok, #16—19 in the above list are evidently omitted
16. Amram I
17. Hilkiah, Hezekiah in the above list
18. Amram II
19. Akkub
20. Akkubiah
21. Hillel I
22. Seriah
23. Levi I
24. Netaniel I
25. Azariah
26. Aabed-El I
27. Hezekiah II(I)
28. Hananiah
29. Amram III
30. Hana, Hillel II in the above list
31. Hezekiah III(IV)
32. Daliah II
33. Akkub II
34. Akkubiah II
35. Levi II
36. Eleazar II
37. Manasseh
38. Jair IV
39. Netaniel II
40. Joachim
41. Jonathan III
42. Elishama
43. Shemaiah
44. Tabia II
45. Amram IV
46. Akabon I
47. Phinehas II
48. Levi III
49. Eleazar III
50. Baba I
51. Eleazar IV
52. Akabon II
53. Netaniel III
54. Akabon III, see #60 in the above list
55. Netaniel IV
56. Akabon IV
57. Eleazar V
58. Akabon V
59. Eleazar VI
60. Akabon VI
61. Eleazar VII
62. Netaniel V
63. Eleazar VIII
64. Netaniel VI
65. Eleazar IX
66. Akabon VII
67. Eleazar X
68. Akabon VIII
69. Eleazar XI
70. Akabon IX
71. Eleazar XII
72. Simeon
73. Levi IV
74. Phinehas III
75. Netaniel VII
76. Baba II(I)
77. Eleazar XIII
78. Netaniel VIII
79. Eleazar XIV
80. Phinehas IV
81. Netaniel IX
82. Aabed-El II
83. Eleazar XV
84. Aabed-El III
85. Eleazar XVI
86. Aaharon II, see #93 on the above list
87. Tsedaka I, see #94 on the above list
88. Amram V
89. Aaharon III
90. Amram VI
91. Aaharon IV
92. Netaniel X
93. Itamar I
94. Amram VI(I), see #98 on the above list
95. Uzzi II, see #99 on the above list
96. Yoseph I, see #100 on the above list
97. Phinehas V, see #101 on the above list
98. Eleazar XVII
99. Phinehas VI
100. Abisha II
101. Eleazar XVIII
102. Phinehas VII
103. Eleazar XIX, see #110 on the above list
104. Phinehas IX
105. (1613–1624) Shalma I
106. (1624–1650) Tsedaka II
107. (1650–1694) Yitzhaq I
108. (1694–1732) Abram
109. (1732–1752) Levi V
110. (1752–1787) Tabia III
111. (1787–1855) Shalma II
112. (1855–1874) Amram VIII
113. (1874–1916) Yaacob I

== See also ==
- Kohanim
- Chief Rabbi
- Rishamma
