= Aharon ben Ab-Chisda ben Yaacob =

Samaritan high priest (1927–2013)

Aharon ben Ab-Chisda ben Yaacob (Samaritan Hebrew: ࠀࠠࠄࠓ࠙ࠬࠍ ࠁࠠࠍ ࠀࠣࠁࠇࠪࠎࠃࠠࠄ ࠁࠠࠍ ࠉࠞࠏࠒࠬࠁ Åʿrron ban Ab-Isdåʿ ban Yā̊ːqob, Hebrew: אהרון בן אב-חסדה ’Ahárōn ben ’Āv-Ḥasdā (ben Ya‘áqōv)), also transliterated as Aaron b. Abhisda b. Jacob, (1 February 1927 – 19 April 2013) was a Samaritan nurse and priest, who in old age, served as the Samaritan High Priest (Cohen Godal).

He was considered by Samaritans to be a direct descendant of Aaron and the 132nd High Priest to hold the office of High Priest since the time of Moses.

== Life ==
Aharon was born in Nablus in 1927 and was educated by his father Ab-Chisda, a son of the High Priest Yaacob I ben Aaharon ben Shalma, learning from him the traditional poems, chants and prayers of the Samaritans.

In early life, Aharon stood out as an exceptional singer and as a reader of the Torah and became an author and poet. To earn a living, for forty-five years he also worked as a nurse at the National Al-Watani Hospital in Nablus, a hospital specializing in oncology, where he was loyal and expert.

Aharon was a younger brother of the High Priest Yoseph ben Ab-Hisda ben Yaacov ben Aaharon. Before becoming high priest himself, he was a deputy high priest and well known in the small Samaritan community. He was married and had four sons and two daughters.

As the eldest living member of the family of priests, on the death of Elazar ben Tsedaka ben Yitzhaq Aharon inherited the office of High Priest. In 2010, at the age of 83, he presided over the Passover ritual for the first time, wearing a green silk robe, secured with a broad cloth, and a tallit draped over his head. In their tradition, the Samaritans trace this attire back to Biblical times. Fewer than 750 of the faithful attended the rite.

On 19 April 2013, Aharon died of heart failure while at home on Mount Gerizim, aged 86.

== Role as High Priest ==
The Samaritan community has more than doubled during the 20th century, but is still small. Its priests, led by the High Priest, regulate the daily life of the community in a number of ways, ensuring its strict rules of religious observance are preserved, such as the full keeping of the Sabbath and other Levitical laws. They also serve as arbitrators and judges and set the calendar, or Ishban Kashta, which translates from Arabic as "true calculation".

One of the High Priest's main duties is to preside over the Passah (Passover) ritual.

== Footnotes ==
Preceded by Elazar ben Tsedaka ben Yitzhaq	Samaritan High Priest; 2010-2013	Succeeded by Aabed-El ben Asher ben Matzliach
