= Phinehas X ben Matzliach ben Phinehas =

126th Samaritan High Priest (1982–1984)

Phinehas X ben Matzliach ben Phinehas was the 126th Samaritan High Priest from 1982 to 1984. He was the son of Matzliach ben Phinhas ben Yitzhaq ben Shalma and the nephew of Abisha III ben Phinhas ben Yittzhaq ben Shalma. He succeeded his brother Asher ben Matzliach ben Phinehas as high priest and was succeeded by Yaacob II ben Uzzi ben Yaacob ben Aaharon in 1984. His nephew became high priest Aabed-El ben Asher ben Matzliach.

Preceded by Asher ben Matzliach ben Phinhas	Samaritan High Priest	Succeeded by Yaacob II ben Uzzi ben Yaacob ben Aaharon
