= Sashai =

1st Samaritan High Priest

Sashai ben Abishua (Sheshai?) was the 1st Samaritan High Priest. He was a contemporary and rival of the Jewish High Priest Eli of Shiloh. He lived in the 15th century BC near the time of Moses.

The succession of high priests explicitly mentioned in Samaritan scripture goes from Moses to Sheshai I, 5th generation from Aaron through teaching of a rite of reciting the name of God, which was more in depth than merely reciting the four letters of the Tetragrammaton.

He may be linked to Sheshai son of Anak. Anak coming from the Greek word Anax meaning king or shaman king As such he may also be linked to the Canaanite king Sheshi of Egypt.

The details of his life and even his existence are unclear, Samaritans credit him as their first high priest, but he rather seems to be the first in their list to deviate from the Israelite list of high priests, being omitted in the Jewish list rather than the line deviating from that point.

The Samaritan and Jewish lists only finally deviate in separate directions at Uzzi who is succeeded by Zeheraiah in the Jewish list, and Sashai II in the Samaritan list.

Patrilineal descent
1. Abraham
2. Isaac
3. Jacob
4. Levi
5. Kohath
6. Amram
7. Aaron
8. Eleazar
9. Phinehas
10. Abishua

Preceded by Abishua (as High Priest of Israel)	Samaritan High Priest	Succeeded by Bukki (as High Priest of Israel)
