= Amram ben Yitzhaq =

Samaritan high priest

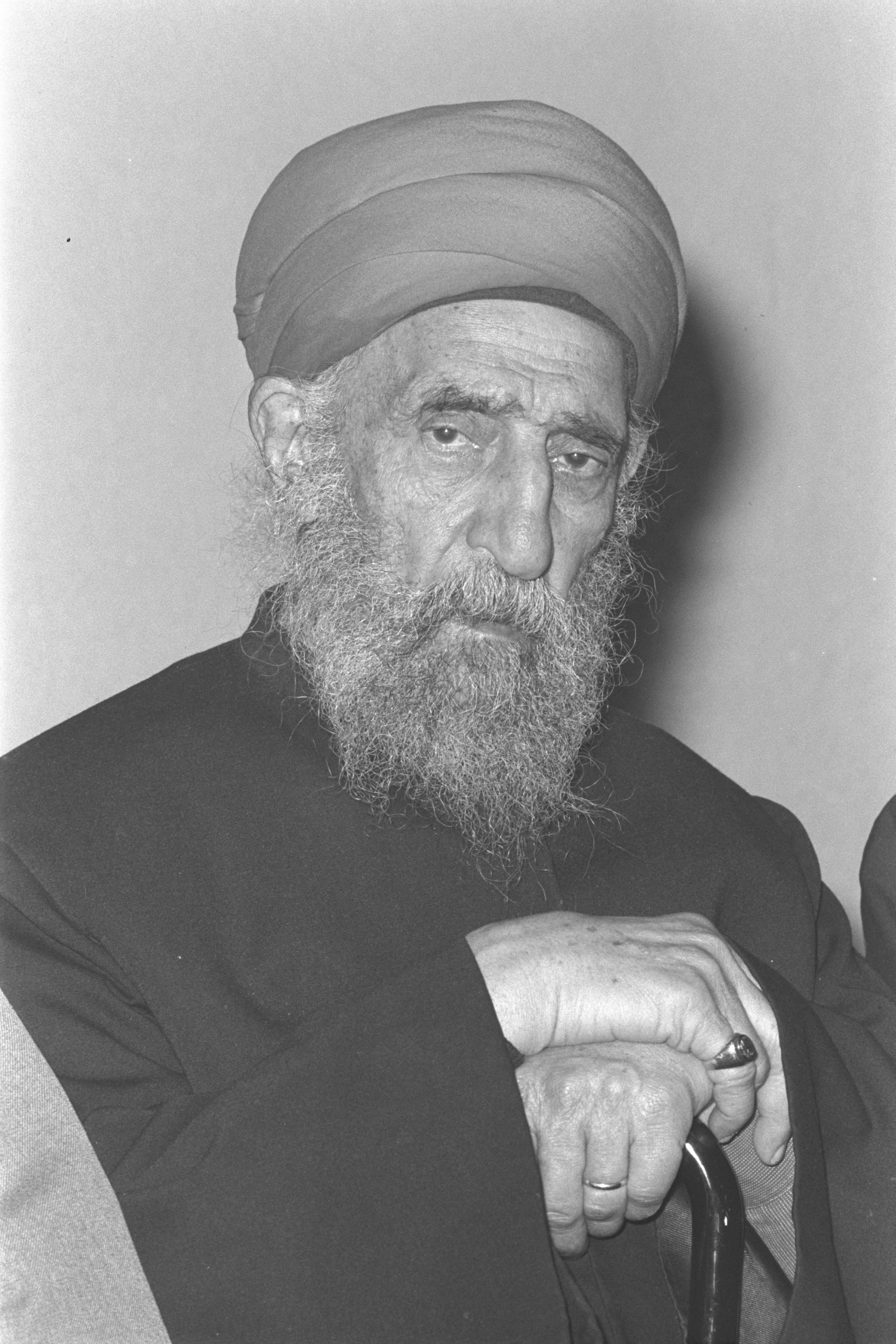
The high priest of the Samaritan community, Amram ben Yitzhaq.

Amram IX ben Yitzhaq ben Amram ben Shalma was the 124th Samaritan High Priest from 1961–1980. He came from the house of Yitzhaq, descendants of Yitzhaq ben Amram ben Shalma. He was the father of Saloum Cohen.

Preceded by Abisha III ben Phinhas ben Yitzhaq ben Shalma	Samaritan High Priest	Succeeded by Asher ben Matzliach ben Phinhas
