= Bukki =

High Priest of Israel

Bukki (Hebrew: בֻּקִּי Buqqī, "proved") may have been an early High Priest of Israel. Another Bukki is mentioned in Numbers as a leader in the Tribe of Dan.

Bukki is mentioned in the books 1 Chronicles (6:4) and Ezra (7:4) as the son of the High Priest Abishua, a priest fifth in descent in the line of Eleazar. In the Apocrypha (2 Esdras 1:2), his name is listed as Borith and in 1 Esdras 8:2, he is called Boccas. According to Josephus (Antiquities of the Jews 5.11.5; 8.1.3) and other extrabiblical sources, he succeeded his father as High Priest.

He is contemporarily identified with the Samaritan High Priest Bakhi. 2nd Samaritan High Priest and Sashai the 1st Samaritan High Priest was possibly his brother

== Patrilineal Ancestry ==
Patrilineal descent
1. Abraham
2. Isaac
3. Jacob
4. Levi
5. Kehath
6. Amram
7. Aaron
8. Eleazar
9. Phinehas
10. Abishua

Israelite religious titles
| Preceded by Abishua | High Priest of Israel | Succeeded by Uzzi |

| Preceded by Sashai | Samaritan High Priest | Succeeded by Uzzi ben Sashai |
