= Jonathan (son of Abiathar) =

Character in the Hebrew Bible

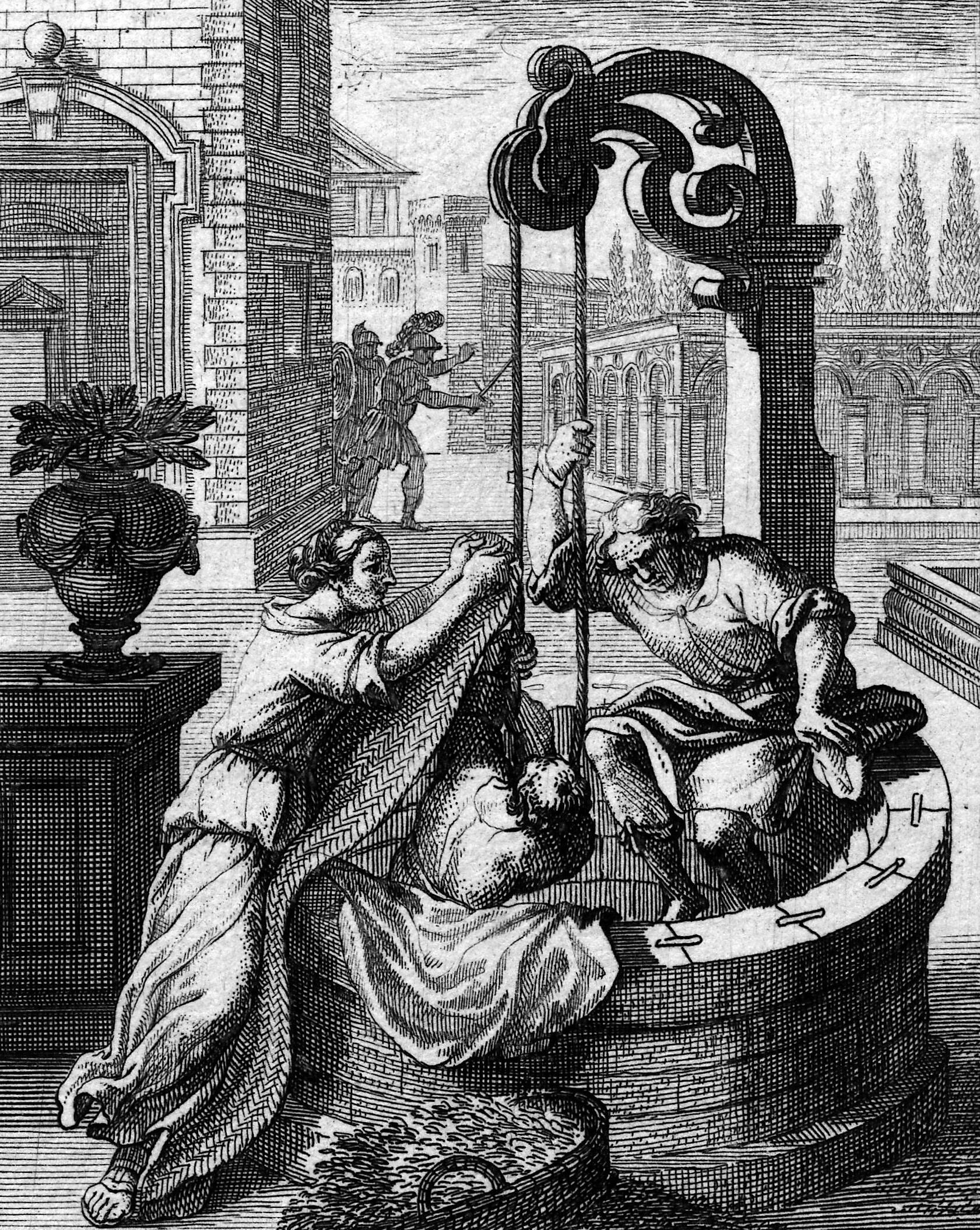
Jonathan and Ahimaaz hide from Absalom by Johann Christoph Weigel, 1695. This woodcut depicts an event recorded in 2 Samuel 17:17-21.

Jonathan is a character in the Hebrew Bible, appearing in 2 Samuel and 1 Kings.

He is introduced as the son of Abiathar the High Priest in 2 Samuel 15:27. He was also a companion of Ahimaaz, son of Zadok: together they work as messengers for David during Absalom's rebellion (2 Sam 15:36). 2 Samuel 17 describes an incident in which they hide from Abasalom's men in a well in Bahurim.

In 1 Kings 1, during Adonijah's conspiracy, Jonathan tells Adonijah that David had made Solomon king (1 Kgs 1:43). Jonathan is not mentioned again, and misses out on becoming high priest, since his father is replaced by Zadok.

Keith Bodner calls him an "under-rated (yet intriguing) character", and notes that he is "used in a larger discussion about succession", which Bodner argues is ironic, "since he himself is banished into obscurity by the succession of a rival house."

Jonathan was the 9th Samaritan High Priest according to Samaritan Genealogical Records.
