= Panehesy (name) =

pA T14 s Z4
or
pA nH H s Z4
Panehesy
in hieroglyphs

Panehesy (pꜣ-nḥsj /pɑ nɛħsi/, also spelled Panehsy, Pinehesy, etc.) is an ancient Egyptian masculine name, meaning "the Nubian." It is suggested to be the original Egyptian form of the Hebrew name Phinehas.

Notable bearers of the name include:

- Panehesy, a priest of Aten under Akhenaten,
- Panehesy, a priest during the reign of Ramesses II,
- Panehesy, vizier under Merenptah,
- Panehesy, Viceroy of Kush under Ramesses XI.

An older version of the name is Nehesy.

- Nehesy, a ruler of the 14th dynasty
- Nehesy, chief treasurer of Hatshepsut
