= David Amram =

American composer, arranger, and conductor

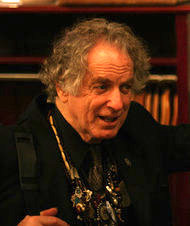

Background information
- Born: David Werner Amram III; November 17, 1930 (age 95); Philadelphia, Pennsylvania, U.S.
- Genres: Jazz, classical, folk
- Occupations: Musician; composer; conductor; author
- Instruments: French horn, piano
- Website: davidamram.com
- Father: Philip Werner Amram
- Relatives: David Werner Amram (grandfather)

David Werner Amram III (born November 17, 1930) is an American composer, arranger, and conductor of orchestral, chamber, and choral works, many with jazz flavorings. He plays piano, French horn, Spanish guitar, and pennywhistle, and sings.

== Early life and education ==
Amram was born in Philadelphia, the son of legal scholar Philip Werner Amram. He studied at the Oberlin Conservatory of Music in 1948–1949, and earned a bachelor's degree in European history from George Washington University in 1952. In 1955 he enrolled at the Manhattan School of Music, where he studied under Dimitri Mitropoulos, Vittorio Giannini, and Gunther Schuller. Under Schuller he studied French horn.

== Career ==
=== Recording and performance ===
As a sideman or leader, Amram has worked with Aaron Copland, Thelonious Monk, Dizzy Gillespie, Charles Mingus, Jack Kerouac, Sonny Rollins, Lionel Hampton, Stan Getz, George Barrow, Jerry Dodgion, Paquito D'Rivera, Pepper Adams, Arturo Sandoval, Oscar Pettiford, Allen Ginsberg, Mary Lou Williams, Kenny Dorham, Ray Barretto, Wynton Marsalis, and others. He has also worked with a wide range of folk, pop, and country figures, such as Bob Dylan, the Roche sisters, Pete Seeger, Odetta, Willie Nelson, Oscar Brand, Judy Collins, Peter Yarrow, Tom Paxton, Phil Ochs, Josh White, Patti Smith, Arlo Guthrie, Jerry Jeff Walker and others.

In 1956, producer Joseph Papp hired Amram to compose scores for the New York Shakespeare Festival. Over the years, Amram composed scores for 25 of Papp's productions, including a number of Shakespeare in the Park presentations. In 1961, he served as guest composer-in-residence for the Marlboro Music Festival in Vermont.

In 1957, Amram, along with Jack Kerouac and poets Howard Hart and Philip Lamantia, staged one of the first poetry readings with jazz at the Brata Art Gallery on East 10th Street, in New York. In an interview with American Legends website, Amram recalled: "Jack and Philip loved each other. That’s why we did that first poetry reading [in 1957]. Just before he died, Philip reminded me of a conversation he had with Jack before On the Road came out...Philip had said to Jack, 'I was a prodigy and received a certain notoriety as a teenager. I couldn’t stand it.' Philip was referring to the period in the 1940s when he was taken up by Charles Henri Ford and the surrealists in New York. He told Jack: 'The whole scene was too weird. If On the Road does well, be prepared to look out.' And Jack said: 'Don’t worry, man. I can handle it.'"

In 1966 Leonard Bernstein chose Amram as the New York Philharmonic's first composer-in-residence. He has performed as conductor and/or soloist with the Brooklyn Philharmonic Orchestra, Toronto Symphony Orchestra, Milwaukee Symphony Orchestra, Indianapolis Symphony Orchestra, Montreal Symphony Orchestra, Grant Park Symphony Orchestra, and for the National Jewish Arts Festival. He has conducted at New York's Carnegie Hall and at Avery Fisher Hall, among other prestigious venues.

The United States Information Agency sponsored a number of Amram's international musical tours, including visits to Brazil (1969); Kenya (1975); Cuba (1977); and the Middle East (1978).

Amram's orchestral works include Symphonic Variations on a Song by Woody Guthrie, (commissioned by the Woody Guthrie Foundation and premiered in 2007) and Three Songs: A Concerto for Piano and Orchestra (written for and premiered by pianist Jon Nakamatsu in 2009). He conducted a 15-piece orchestra for Betty Carter's 1982 album Whatever Happened to Love?.

Amram is a strong advocate for music education. For over a quarter-century he served as music director for youth and family concert programs for the Brooklyn Philharmonic. Amram has said: "It is tremendously important for professional people to work with the young. That is the way a true music culture is created—not through merchandising, but through love."

=== Film and television ===
In 1959, Amram wrote the score for and appeared in the Robert Frank/Alfred Leslie short film Pull My Daisy, which featured Jack Kerouac, Allen Ginsberg, Peter Orlovsky and Gregory Corso.

He composed scores for the Elia Kazan films Splendor in the Grass (1961) and The Arrangement (1969), and for the John Frankenheimer films The Young Savages (1961) and The Manchurian Candidate (1962). (He composed the score for Frankenheimer's 1964 film Seven Days in May, but it was rejected and replaced with a score by Jerry Goldsmith.)

Amram composed the score for the 2001 documentary Boys of Winter, about the lives of 1940s–50s Brooklyn Dodgers baseball stars Pee Wee Reese and Carl Erskine. The feature was awarded the "Best Documentary Film" honor at that year's New York Independent Film Festival. In 2013, he wrote the score for the Michael Patrick Kelly comedy-drama Isn't It Delicious, which starred Kathleen Chalfant and Keir Dullea.

== Career sidelights ==
In a 2007 interview, he observed: "The pennywhistle is a versatile instrument. Just as a violin can be used for either classical or bluegrass, the pennywhistle can be used different ways. Audiences in Kenya enjoyed it when I went there for the World Council of Churches and played African music in 1976. Dizzy Gillespie dug how I used the pennywhistle as a jazz instrument when I played with him in Havana in 1977."

In his 1968 book Vibrations, he describes making an omelette for Charlie Parker with "fried onions, marmalade, maple syrup, bacon, tomatoes, covered with hot mayonnaise with some garlic fried in it and a little cheese sauce", saying they "wolfed down portions of it" with borscht and orange soda.

Amram is mentioned in the popular children's song "Peanut Butter Sandwich" by Raffi, in the line "one for me and one for David Amram", a fact which Amram said "impressed" his children; Raffi later admitted that he had mentioned Amram because he "couldn't think of anything [else] to rhyme with 'jam'."

== Discography ==
=== As leader ===
- The Eastern Scene (Decca, 1957)
- The Young Savages (Columbia, 1961)
- The Arrangement (Warner Bros., 1969)
- No More Walls (RCA, 1971)
- Subway Night (RCA Victor, 1973)
- Triple Concerto for Woodwind, Brass, Jazz Quintets and Orchestra (RCA, 1974)
- Summer Nights/Winter Rain (RCA Victor, 1976)
- Havana/New York (Flying Fish, 1978)
- At Home/Around the World (Flying Fish, 1980)
- Autobiography (Flying Fish, 1982)
- Latin-Jazz Celebration (Elektra/Musician, 1983)
- Live at Musikfest! (New Chamber Music, 1990)
- An American Original (Newport Classic, 1993)
- On the Waterfront On Broadway (Varèse Sarabande, 1995)
- Three Concertos (Newport Classic, 1995)
- The Final Ingredient (Premier, 1996)
- The Manchurian Candidate (Premier, 1997)
- Southern Stories (Chrome, 1999)
- So in America: Selected Chamber Music Compositions 1958–2017 (Affetto, 2018)

=== As sideman ===
- Pepper Adams, Modern Jazz Survey 2/Baritones & French Horns (Prestige, 1957)
- Richard Barone, Sorrows & Promises (Ship to Shore, 2017)
- David Bromberg, David Bromberg (Columbia, 1971)
- Betty Carter, Betty Carter (Verve, 1990)
- Kenny Dorham, Blue Spring (Riverside, 1959)
- Kenny Dorham, Kenny Dorham and Friends (Jazzland, 1962)
- Fireships, Fireships (Revelator Music, 2015)
- Curtis Fuller, Curtis Fuller and Hampton Hawes with French Horns (Status, 1965)
- Steve Goodman, Say It in Private (Asylum, 1977)
- Steve Goodman, Artistic Hair (Red Pajama, 1983)
- Steve Goodman, The Easter Tapes (Red Pajama, 1996)
- Lionel Hampton, Crazy Rhythm (EmArcy, 1955)
- Lionel Hampton, Jam Session in Paris (EmArcy, 1955)
- Steve Martin, The Crow (Rounder, 2009)
- Mat Mathews, 4 French Horns Plus Rhythm (Elektra, 1957)
- John McEuen, Roots Music Made in Brooklyn (Chesky, 2016)
- T. S. Monk, Monk On Monk (N2K Encoded Music, 1997)
- Oscar Pettiford, In Hi-Fi (ABC-Paramount, 1956)
- Oscar Pettiford, Oscar Pettiford Orchestra in Hi-Fi Vol. Two (ABC-Paramount, 1958)
- Sal Salvador, Colors in Sound (Decca, 1958)
- Pete Seeger, Tomorrow's Children (Appleseed, 2010)
- Rosalie Sorrels, What Ever Happened to the Girl That Was (Paramount, 1973)
- Kate Taylor, Kate Taylor (Columbia, 1978)
- Happy Traum, Just for the Love of It (Lark's Nest Music, 2015)
- Loudon Wainwright III, Album III (Columbia, 1972)
- Jerry Jeff Walker, Too Old to Change (Elektra, 1979)
- Mary Lou Williams, Music for Peace (Mary, 1970)
- Mary Lou Williams, Mary Lou's Mass (Mary, 1975)
- Raffi, “Singable Songs for the Very Young” (Shoreline Records, 1976)

== Bibliography ==
- 1968: Vibrations: The Adventures and Musical Times of David Amram (Illustrated reprint 2001, Thunder's Mouth Press) ISBN 1-56025-308-8
- 2002: Offbeat: Collaborating with Kerouac (Paradigm) ISBN 1-56025-460-2
- 2007: Upbeat: Nine Lives of a Musical Cat (Paradigm) ISBN 978-1-59451-424-1
- 2008: Vibrations: The Adventures and Musical Times of David Amram, new edition with introduction by historian Douglas Brinkley (Paradigm) ISBN 978-1-594515-835
- 1986: "Making Music" (Atheneum) ISBN 0689311192 by Arthur K. Paxton

== See also ==
- The Village Trip
