= Elazar ben Tsedaka ben Yitzhaq =

Samaritan high priest (1927–2010)

Elazar ben Tsedaka ben Yitzhaq

VOA report about Samaritans from 2008 with interview of Tsedaka

Elazar ben Tsedaka ben Yitzhaq (Samaritan Hebrew: ࠀࠝࠋࠟࠏࠆࠠࠓ ࠁࠣࠍ ࠑࠩࠃࠬࠒࠠࠄ ࠁࠣࠍ ࠉࠜࠑࠞࠇࠒ, romanized: ʾElā̊ʿzår ban Ṣīdqåʿ ban Yēṣʿā̊q; Hebrew: אלעזר בן צדקה בן יצחק; 16 January 1927 – 3 February 2010) was the Samaritan High Priest from 2004 until his death. He was born in Nablus. He succeeded his cousin Saloum Cohen in 2004. According to tradition he is the 131st holder of this post since Aaron.

During his time in office, he would lead the Samaritan community in their annual Passover ritual sacrifice of sheep.

Before retirement he worked as a mathematics teacher. His funeral in February 2010 was attended by Israeli and Palestinian officials, who noted his major efforts in helping to guide his community, and to serve as a bridge between Israeli and Palestinian communities.

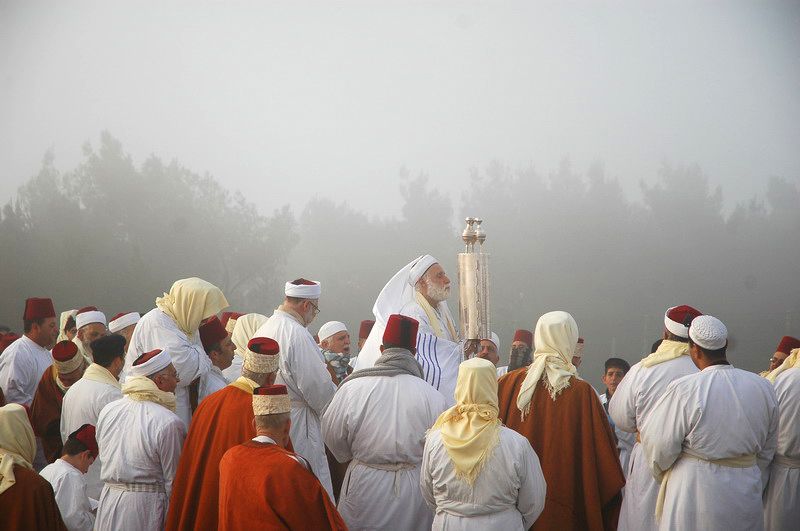
Elazar presiding over the Samaritan Passover at Mount Gerizim

| Preceded by Saloum Cohen | Samaritan High Priest; 2004–2010 | Succeeded by Aharon ben Ab-Chisda ben Yaacob |
