= Levi ben Abisha ben Phinhas ben Yitzhaq =

Levi ben Abisha ben Phinehas ben Yitzhaq (1920–23 May 2001), also known as Levi Ben Abisha Hacohen, was the 129th Samaritan High Priest from 1998 until his death in 2001.

In his secular work prior to his retirement, he was chief clerk in the Nablus bus company. Before and after his retirement from secular work he was a genial and well-known teacher. He petitioned the Supreme Court of Israel to grant Samaritan priests equality in law with rabbis; the petition was still pending at the time of his death. He lived in Nablus in the West Bank and is buried in the cemetery of Kiryat Luza on Mount Gerizim. He was succeeded as high priest by his second cousin Saloum Cohen.

Preceded by Yoseph ben Ab-Hisda ben Yaacov ben Aaharon	Samaritan High Priest; 1998–2001	Succeeded by Saloum Cohen

== Sources ==
- The (London) Independent, 4 June 2001.
