= Matzliach ben Phinhas ben Yitzhaq ben Shalma =

122nd Samaritan High Priest (1933–1943)

Matzliach ben Phinhas ben Yitzhaq ben Shalma was the 122nd Samaritan High Priest from 1933 to 1943. He was succeeded by his brother Abisha III ben Phinhas ben Yitzhaq ben Shalma, both of them being members of the clan of Phinhas, descendants of Phinhas ben Yitzhaq ben Shalma. His sons Asher ben Matzliach ben Phinehas and Phinehas X ben Matzliach ben Phinehas would later become high priests. His grandson became high priest Aabed-El ben Asher ben Matzliach.

Preceded by Yitzhaq II ben Amram ben Shalma ben Tabia	Samaritan High Priest	Succeeded by Abisha III ben Phinhas ben Yitzhaq ben Shalma
