= Abu'l-Fath =

14th-century Samaritan chronicler

Abu'l-Fath ibn Abi al-Hasan al-Samiri al-Danafi, (Arabic: أبو الفتح إبن أبي الحسن السامري) was a 14th-century Samaritan chronicler. His major work is Kitāb al-Tārīkh (Arabic: كتاب التاريخ).

== Kitāb al-Tārīkh ==
This work was commissioned in 1352 by Pinḥas, Samaritan High Priest, and begun in 1356. It is an Arabic compilation of Samaritan history from cited earlier sources, running from Adam to Mohammed. This book is the oldest and most complete Samaritan work that has survived until the present day.
