= Kanai (Judaism) =

Zealot or fanatic in Hebrew

Kanai (Hebrew: קנאי, plural: kana'im, קנאים) is a term for a zealot or fanatic. It means one who is zealous on behalf of God.

== The first kanai'im ==
The first kanai mentioned in the Tanakh is Pinchas (Phinehas). Pinchas was rewarded by God for his zealotry because he did not act out of hate or for any personal gain, but solely for the sake of God.

Elijah the Prophet is also described, by himself, as a kanai, as described in the Book of Kings (1 Kings 19:10): "I have been very zealous for the Lord God Almighty. The Israelites have rejected your covenant, torn down your altars, and put your prophets to death with the sword. I am the only one left, and now they are trying to kill me too". However, this sort of self-proclaimed zealotry is condemned by God, as described in verses 11-18.

== Kanaim of the 1st century ==
Zealotry, described by Josephus as one of the "four sects" of Judaism during his time, was a political movement in first century Judaism which sought to incite the people of Iudaea Province to rebel against the Roman Empire and expel it from the Holy Land by force of arms, most notably during the First Jewish–Roman War (66-70 CE).

== Kanaim of the 18th century ==
Rabbi Jacob Emden who fought the remnants of the Sabbateans was considered a kanai.

== Kanaim of the 19th century in the Holy Land ==
Starting in the middle of the 19th century, those fighting the attempts of the Maskilim to introduce secular institutions to Jerusalem were known as kanaim. Among the kanaim was the leader of the Perushim Rabbi Yehoshua Leib Diskin who banned the secular institutions.

== Kanaim in the 20th century ==
The Anti-Zionist Neturei Karta are called kanaim. Its leader was the Jerusalem-born Rabbi Amram Blau.

In modern history Kana'ut (zealotry) has taken on new meanings. While during the previous centuries Kana'ut was considered a positive attribute, which simulated the zealotry of Pinchas; the kana'im of today are considered by many religious Jews as fanatic. Those feelings became more pronounced when a delegation of the Neturei Karta attended the conference in Tehran on Holocaust Denial. Many Jewish organizations, including the Anti-Zionist Satmar, issued a formal protest.

== See also ==
- Zealotry
