= Amram ibn Salameh =

Samaritan liturgical poet

Amram ibn Salameh ibn Ghazal ha-Kohen ha-Levi was a Samaritan liturgical poet of late antiquity. A number of prayers by him are incorporated in a liturgy, a fragment of which is in the Bodleian Library at Oxford, England. They consist of hymns for the Ten Days of Repentance, for both the morning and the evening services, as well as liturgic poems for the seven days of Sukkot, morning and evening.
