= Saloum Cohen =

Palestinian politician

Samaritan High Priest
- In office 2001–2004
- Succeeded by: Elazar ben Tsedaka ben Yitzhaq

Member of the Palestinian Legislative Council
- In office 1996–?

Personal details
- Born: 13 January 1921
- Died: 9 February 2004 (aged 83)

Saloum Cohen, also known as Shalom ben Amram ben Yitzhaq, (Hebrew: שלום בן עמרם בן יצחק; 13 January 1921 – 9 February 2004), served as the Samaritan High Priest from 2001 until his death. He lived in Nablus in the West Bank and is buried in the cemetery of Kiryat Luza on Mount Gerizim.

He was elected as a member of the Palestinian Legislative Council in 1996 out of three Samaritan candidates for their reserved seat (elected by all electors, not only by Samaritans).

His successor as High Priest is Elazar ben Tsedaka ben Yitzhaq.

Preceded by Levi ben Abisha ben Phinhas ben Yitzhaq	Samaritan High Priest; 2001–2004	Succeeded by Elazar ben Tsedaka ben Yitzhaq

== Sources ==
- "The High Priest, Shalom, son of Amram, son of Issac has passed away", The Samaritan Update III, 13 (February 12, 2004)
- "Shalom b. Amram, the Samaritan High Priest is dead. The new High Priest is Elazar b. Tsedaka", The Samaritan Update III, 14 (February 26, 2004)
- "The Samaritan Delegation", The Samaritan Update (March 28, 2002)
