= Abishua =

High Priest of Israel

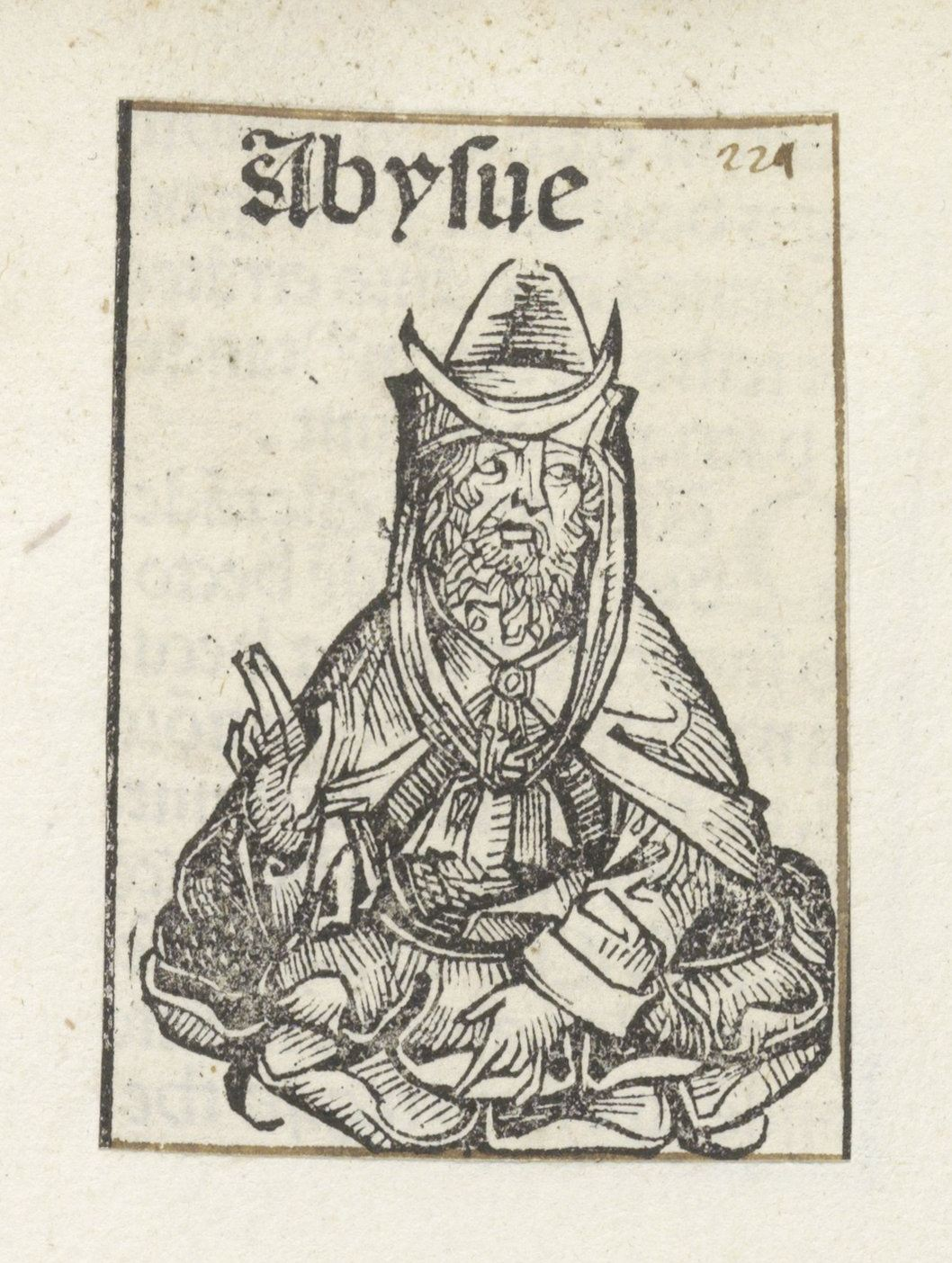
A 1493 depiction of Abishua from the Nuremberg Chronicles by Hartmann Schedel

Abishua (Hebrew: אֲבִישׁוּעַ ʾĂḇīšūaʿ, "my father is rescue") was an early High priest of Israel. Abishua is mentioned in the books 1 Chronicles (6:3-5) and Ezra (7:5) as the son of the High Priest Phinehas, son of Eleazar. As such, he is the great-grandson of Aaron, the brother of Moses, Israel's first High Priest. It is likely that Abishua was a contemporary of the Israelite judge Ehud and the Moabite king Eglon.

According to Josephus and other extrabiblical sources, he succeeded his father as High Priest (Antiquities 5.11.5; 8.1.3).

== Name and namesakes ==
- The meaning of the name "Abishua" is uncertain, but may be "the (divine) father is opulence."
- The name also appears in reference to a grandson of Benjamin in 1 Chronicles 8:4.

Patrilineal descent
1. Abraham
2. Isaac
3. Jacob
4. Levi
5. Kehath
6. Amram
7. Aaron
8. Eleazar
9. Phinehas

Israelite religious titles
Preceded by Phinehas	High Priest of Israel; Years unknown	Succeeded by Sashai (According to Samaritans); Bukki (according to the Tanakh)
