= Yitzhaq II ben Amram ben Shalma ben Tabia =

121st Samaritan High Priest

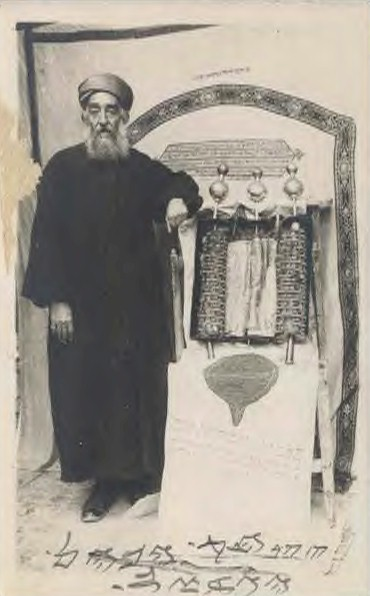
Yitzhaq II ben Amram ben Shalma ben Tabia with the Abisha Scroll

Yitzhaq II ben Amram ben Shalma ben Tabia was the 121st Samaritan High Priest from 1916–1932. He is the progenitor of the house of Yitzhaq, one of the three houses of Samaritan High Priests.

== Gallery ==
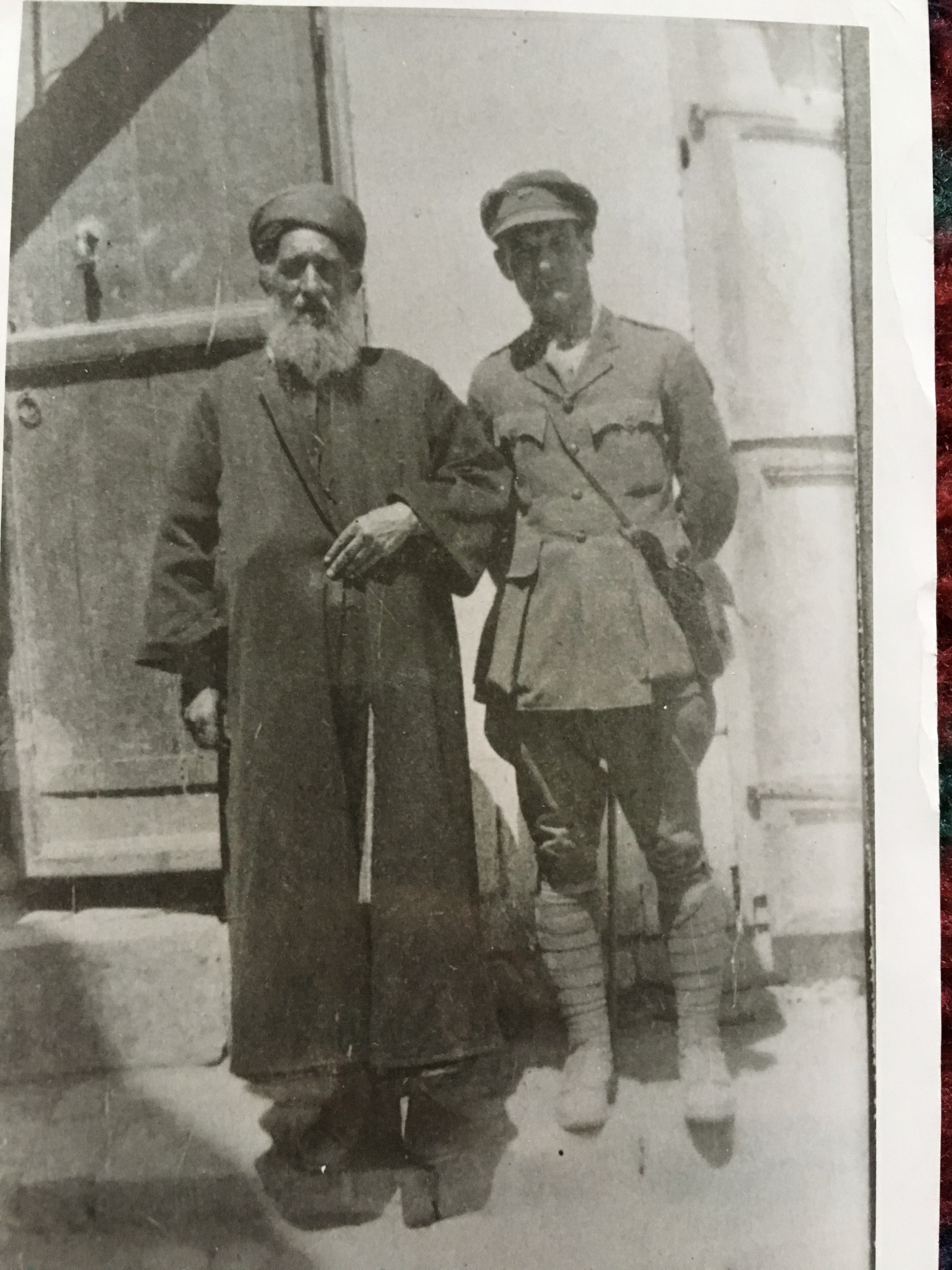
Yitzhaq ben Amram ben Shalma ben Tabia, Samaritan High Priest, taking refuge from riots on Easter 1920 with Dr. A.C. Harte, Director of Jerusalem YMCA.

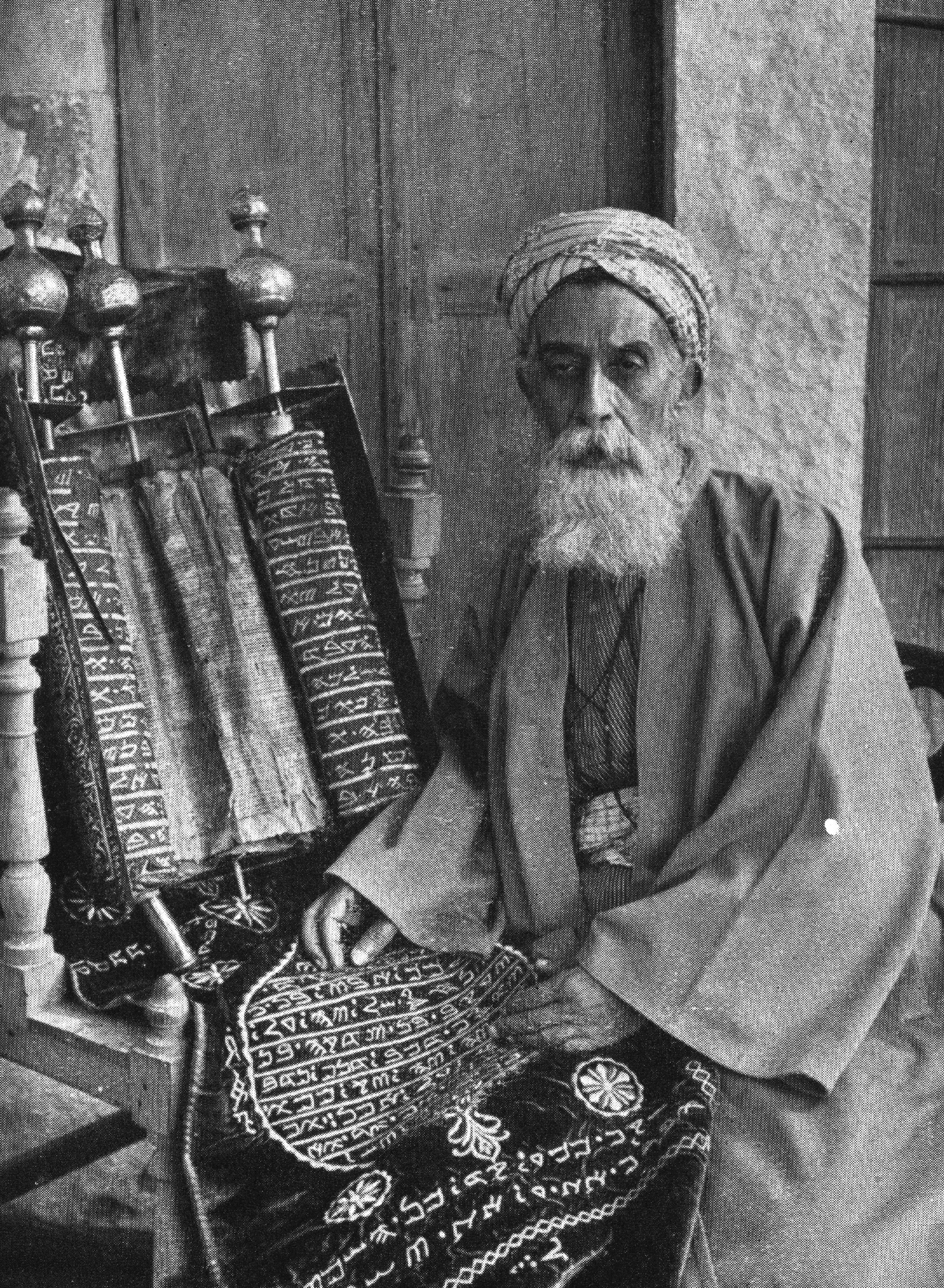
Yitzhaq ben Amram ben Shalma ben Tabia

Preceded by Yaacob I ben Aaharon ben Shalma	Samaritan High Priest	Succeeded by Matzliach ben Phinhas ben Yitzhaq ben Shalma
