= Philip Werner Amram =

American lawyer and legal scholar

- Born: 1900; Philadelphia, Pennsylvania, U.S.
- Died: April 20, 1990 (aged 90); Allendale, New Jersey, U.S.
- Children: 2, including David Amram
- Relatives: David Werner Amram (father)

Academic background
- Education: University of Pennsylvania (BA, LLB); Pennsylvania State College (BS)

Academic work
- Discipline: Law
- Sub-discipline: International law

Philip Werner Amram (1900 – April 20, 1990) was an American lawyer and legal scholar.

== Education ==
Amram received a Bachelor of Arts degree in liberal arts from the University of Pennsylvania in 1920, and a Bachelor of Science in agriculture from Pennsylvania State College in 1922, and a Bachelor of Laws from the University of Pennsylvania Law School in 1927, where he served as editor-in-chief of the University of Pennsylvania Law Review.

== Career ==
Amram worked as a faculty member at the University of Pennsylvania Law School from 1929 to 1942. During World War II, he served as special assistant to the United States attorney general. He was an expert on international private law and served as the chairman of the United States delegation to the 1972 Hague Conference on International Private Law. He also served as president of La Fondation de l'Ecole Francaise Internationale and was a legal adviser to the French Embassy. He was awarded numerous honors, including commander of the French Légion d'honneur and L'Ordre des Palmes Academiques.

While serving as editor-in-chief of the University of Pennsylvania Law Review, Amram threatened to resign his post when the law school dean attempted to bar Sadie Alexander from becoming the first African-American woman elected to the board of editors. The dean relented, and Alexander was permitted to join the law review.

Amram's primary area of expertise was in legal disputes between private citizens of different countries. He was also an expert on Pennsylvania law, and authored numerous books on the topic, including Amram's Pennsylvania Common Pleas Practice (1970), New Federal Rules in Pennsylvania (1938) and Goodrich-Amram Pennsylvania Procedural Rules Service (published annually from 1940 through 1980).

The Philip Werner Amram Award was established in his honor in 1990.

== Personal life ==
His father was David Werner Amram, a prominent lawyer and early American Zionist. His son David Amram is a noted composer, musician and writer.
