= Yaacob I ben Aaharon ben Shalma =

120th Samaritan High Priest

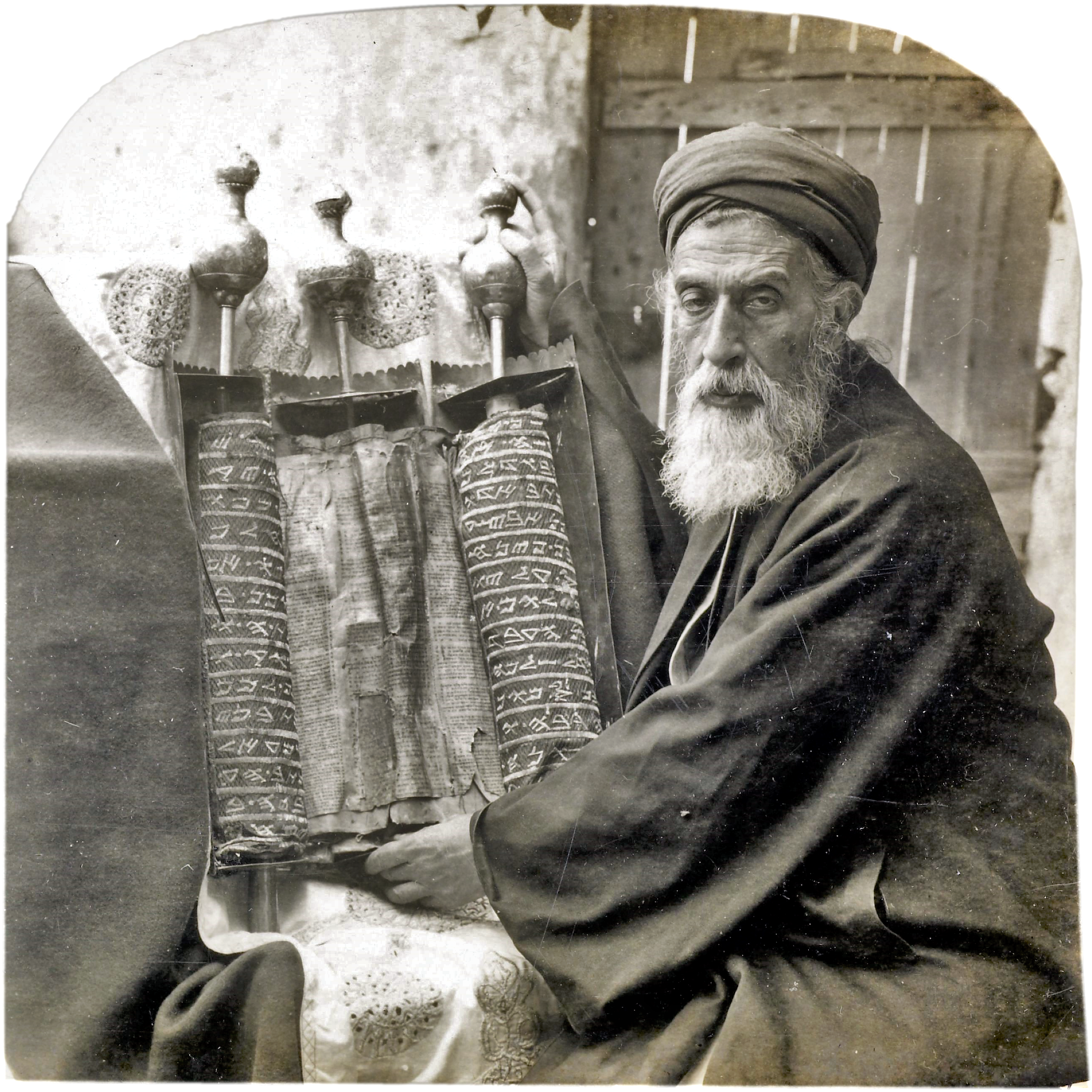
Yaacob I holding a Samaritan Torah Scroll

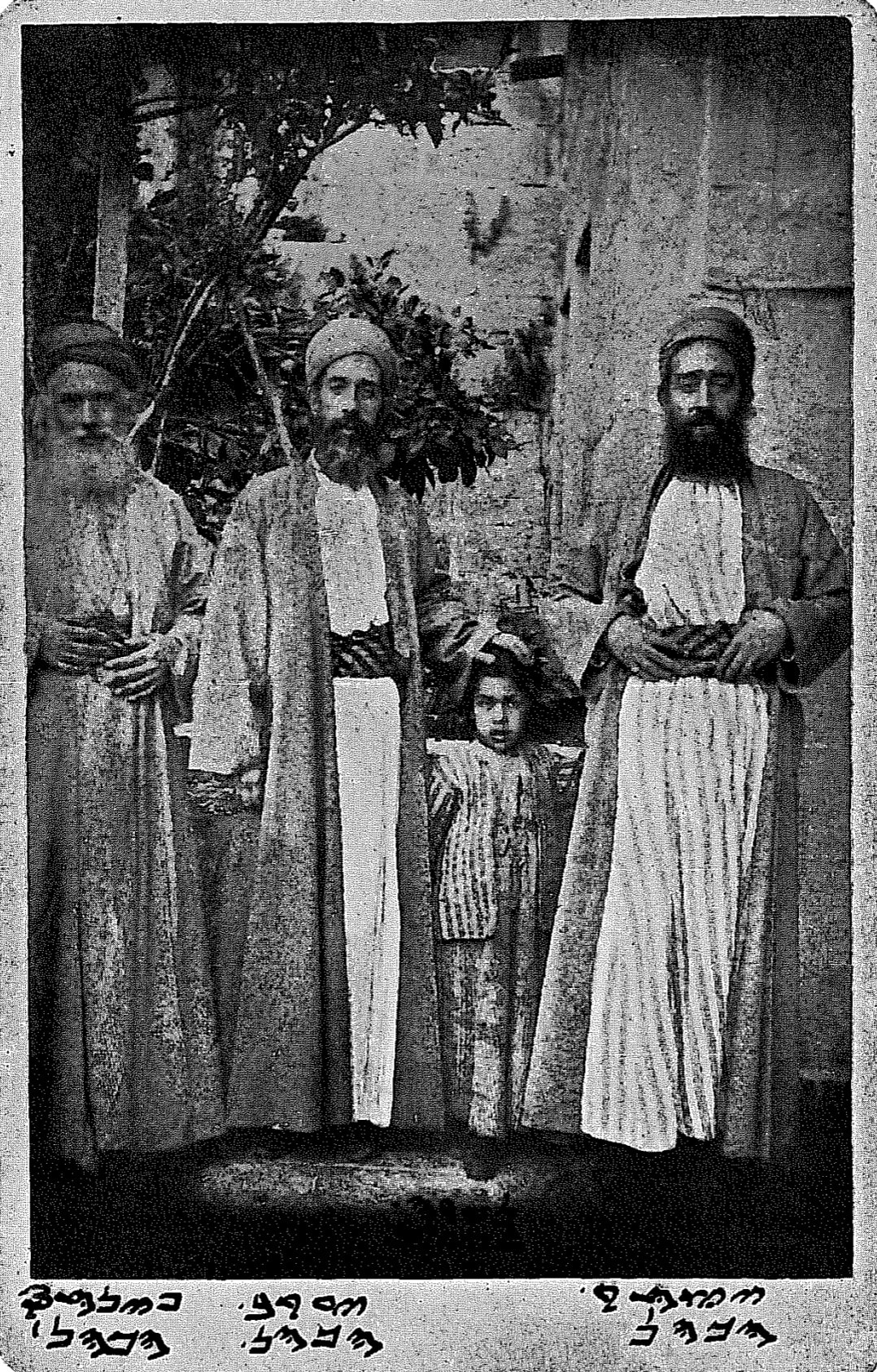
Yaacob I in the center with his daughter to his left

Yaacob I ben Aaharon ben Shalma was the 120th Samaritan High Priest from 1874 to 1916. Ben Aharon was described as "legendary" for his role in the revitalization of the Samaritan community. He befriended prominent Zionists, did a fundraising trip to England, and became the face of his community for Westerners. His memoirs were translated into English. Yaacob inherited the role of the high priest at the age of just 32 and carried the role until his death in 1916. Yaacob was instrumental in the survival of the Samaritans, he made connections that provided Samaritans with as much of a tent, a luxury for Samaritans who, in his time, had merely nothing, he was also instrumental in the reunification of Samaritans from all areas of the country. Yaacob still has descendants living to this day, their family is even considered the sons of Yaacob and called the "House of Yaacob", his grandson, also named Yaacob, whom he raised, eventually became a Samaritan high priest for about three years between 1984 and 1987, Yaacob's death was directly connected to the drafting of 25 Samaritan adult men into the Ottoman army, this seriously devastated Samaritan futures and he died of a heart attack during a pilgrimage to the holy mountain; his grandson was just 16. He is the progenitor of the house of Jacob, one of the three houses of Samaritan High Priests.

Religious titles
Preceded by Amram VIII	Samaritan High Priest	Succeeded by Yitzhaq II
