= Amram of Mainz =

Amram of Mainz or Amram of Mayence is a legendary rabbi of whom the following legend is told.

After having been the head of a yeshiva at Mainz, his native place, he went to Cologne to found a school. As his end drew near, he expressed to his pupils the desire to be buried with his fathers in Mainz, but fearing obstacles, they hesitated to promise to fulfill his wishes. Thereupon he ordered them to place his coffin upon a boat on the Rhine, and let it go forth alone. This they did, but no sooner was the body of the saint put into the boat than, to the great astonishment of all the people, it took its course up the Rhine, and without boatmen or rudder made for the city of Mainz and turned toward the shore. All the inhabitants came to see the wondrous sight, and marveled who the saint might be that performed such miracles even when dead. At last the Jews learned of the death of the master of Cologne, and they took the body ashore, desiring to honor him by solemn obsequies in the synagogue. But the Christian Archbishop of Mainz objected, claiming him as a saint of the Church and giving orders to bury him as a Christian. Another miracle followed. The body became so heavy that none could move it from the spot. Straightway the bishop ordered that a church should be built directly over the body of the saint, and set watchmen to guard it, lest the Jews should take it away by stealth. Then the saint appeared in a vision to his pupils in Cologne, and told them to have his body taken at midnight while the watchmen were asleep, and to put another corpse in its place; which they did.

This legend was still narrated at the beginning of the 19th century as an actual occurrence; and a pictorial representation on an old house near one of the gates of Mainz, close to the shore of the river, was shown to illustrate the fact. The name of the church was St. Emeran's Church. Tendlau (Buch d. Sagen u. Legenden Jüdischer Vorzeit; "Die Amram's Kirche", pp. 9–15) refers in a note (p. 354) to the Shalshelet ha-Qabbalah and other sources, wondering how the same story could have been told of Rabbi Amram of Regensburg (instead of Cologne) in one of the Ma'ase bücher (books of legends). He certainly had no knowledge of the strange fact that, in connection with St. Emmeran's Church near Regensburg, the same story was told by Christians; viz.: that Saint Emmeran had died in Munich, and that his body had been carried with wondrous rapidity in a boat without boatmen from the river Isar up the Danube to Regensburg, where in honor of the saint the chapel was erected (see Panzer, Bairische Sagen, i. 221). Strangely enough, the Jews were especially held up to reproach for not believing this miracle regarding St. Emmeran's Church (see Pertz, Monumenta Germaniæ, vi. 549, quoted by Cassel, article Juden, in Ersch und Gruber, p. 67, note 56). In all probability the Jewish legend was borrowed from the Christian, and Emmeran transformed into Amram; nothing else being known of Rabbi Amram, either in Mayence, Cologne, or Regensburg. Moses Sofer takes him for Amram Gaon, and says that he saw his grave in Mayence (Ḥatam Sofer, Orah Hayyim, p. 16).

Concerning the origin of the old Teutonic legend, see:

- Felix Liebrecht's edition of Gervasius of Tilbury Otia Imperialia, p. 149
- Wilhelm Mannhardt, Germanische Mythen, p. 360
- compare also Hermann Usener's Sintflutsagen
