= Yoseph ben Ab-Hisda ben Yaacov ben Aaharon =

128th Samaritan High Priest

Yoseph ben Ab-Hisda ben Yaacov ben Aaharon; (1919 – 14 February 1998), served as the Samaritan High Priest from 26 January 1987 until his death.

Prior to inheriting the post of high priest, he worked as a religious teacher and was principal of the Samaritan school. A noted author and scribe like many of his kinsmen, his houses in Nablus and on Mount Gerizim were open to visitors from all over the world who sought to understand the Samaritan teachings. As high priest, he sought to follow a policy of non-active involvement—maintaining peaceful relations as far as possible with all factions in the political conflicts of the region. He lived in Nablus in the West Bank and is buried in the cemetery of Kiryat Luza on Mount Gerizim. His brothers Aaharon and Yephet survived him, as did his wife, his four children, and seven grandchildren. Both Palestinian and Israeli dignitaries were present at his funeral. He was succeeded as high priest by his second cousin Levi ben Abisha ben Phinhas ben Yitzhaq.

Preceded by Yaacob II ben Uzzi ben Yaacob ben Aaharon	Samaritan High Priest	Succeeded by Levi ben Abisha ben Phinhas ben Yitzhaq
