= David Werner Amram =

American lawyer

- Born: May 16, 1866; Philadelphia, Pennsylvania, U.S.
- Died: June 27, 1939 (aged 73)
- Education: B.A., University of Pennsylvania (1887); LL.B., University of Pennsylvania Law School (1889)
- Occupations: Lawyer; legal scholar; author
- Employer: University of Pennsylvania Law School
- Organizations: Federation of American Zionists; Zionist Organization of America
- Known for: Early American Zionist; scholarship on biblical and talmudic law; The Makers of Hebrew Books in Italy
- Notable work: The Jewish Law of Divorce According to Bible and Talmud (1896); Leading Cases in the Bible (1905); The Makers of Hebrew Books in Italy (1909)

David Werner Amram (May 16, 1866 – June 27, 1939) was a prominent lawyer and legal scholar, as well as an early American Zionist.

Born in Philadelphia, Pennsylvania, he received a B.A. from the University of Pennsylvania in 1887, and an LL.B. from the University of Pennsylvania Law School in 1889. He later served as a member of the law school faculty, where he was eventually joined by his son, Philip Werner Amram. He is also noted for his biblical and talmudic scholarship, and published numerous books on the subject, including The Jewish Law of Divorce According to Bible and Talmud (1896), Leading Cases in the Bible (1905). His most famous book, The Makers of Hebrew Books in Italy (1909), details the earliest history of Hebrew book printing, including the first complete edition of the Talmud published by Daniel Bomberg in the early sixteenth century.

Amram was among the earliest adherents of the Zionist movement. He served as a director of the Federation of American Zionists, and as an editor of The Maccabean, the official publication of the Zionist Organization of America.

== Bibliography ==
- Biographical Sketch of David Werner Amram
