= Phinehas =

Biblical priest and prophet who opposed the heresy of Peor

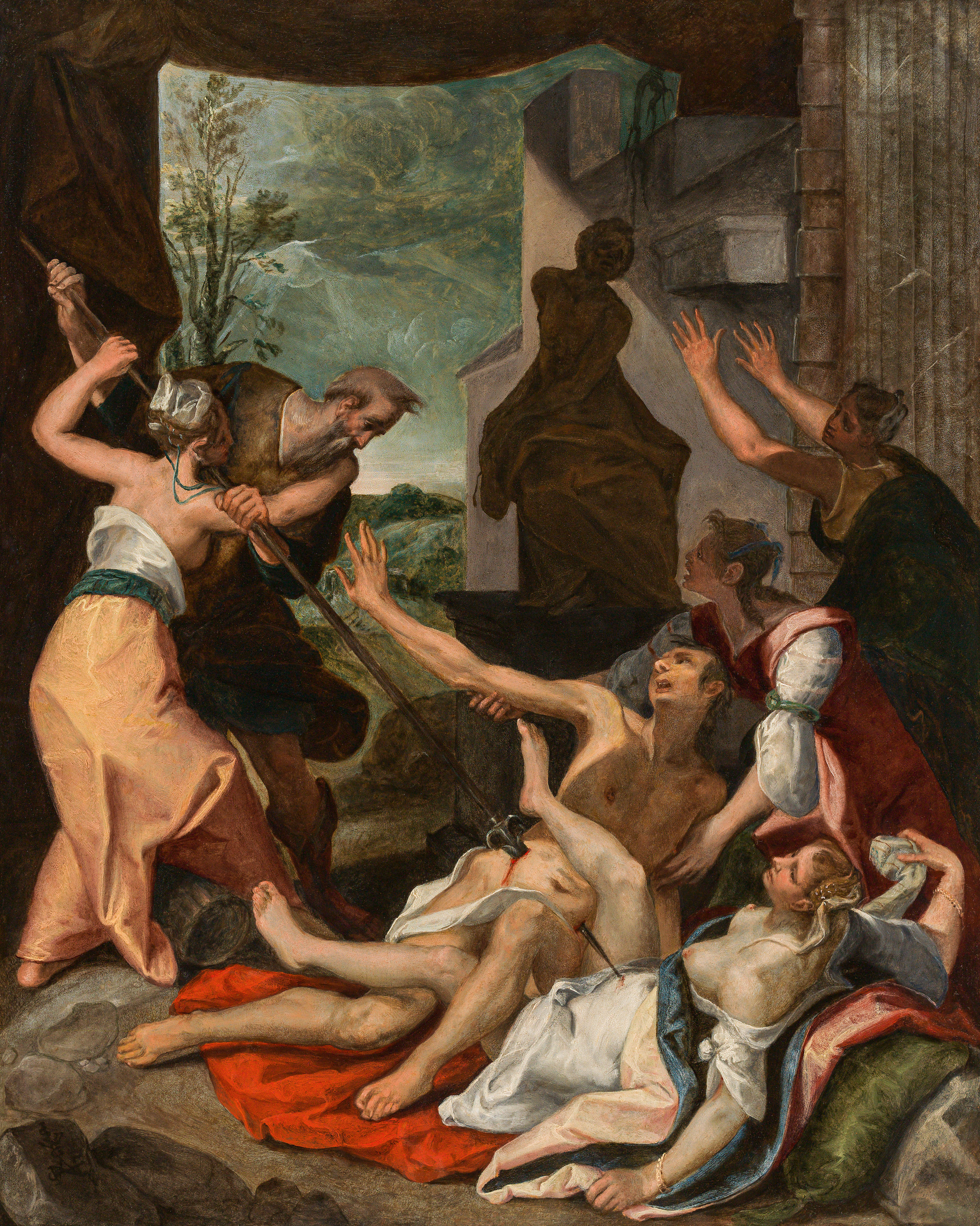
Phinehas slaying Zimri and Cozbi the Midianite by Jeremias van Winghe

According to the Hebrew Bible, Phinehas (also spelled Phineas, /ˈfɪniəs/; Hebrew: פִּינְחָס, romanized: Pînəḥās, Ancient Greek: Φινεές Phinees, Latin: Phinees) was a priest during the Exodus. The grandson of Aaron and son of Eleazar, the High Priests (Exodus 6:25), he distinguished himself as a youth at Shittim with his zeal against the heresy of Peor.

Displeased with the immorality with which the Moabites and Midianites had successfully tempted the Israelites (Numbers 25:1–9) to inter-marry and to worship Baal-peor, Phinehas personally executed an Israelite man and a Midianite woman while they were together in the man's tent, running a javelin or spear through the man and the belly of the woman, bringing to an end the plague sent by Yahweh to punish the Israelites for sexually intermingling with the Midianites.

Phinehas is commended by Yahweh in Numbers 25:10–13, as well as King David in Psalm 106 (Psalms 106:28–31) for having stopped Israel's fall into idolatrous practices brought in by Midianite women, as well as for stopping the desecration of Yahweh's sanctuary. After the entry to the land of Israel and the death of his father, he was appointed the third High Priest of Israel, and served at the sanctuary of Bethel (Judges 20:28).

== Name ==
The name "Phinehas" probably comes from the Egyptian name Pa-nehasi (pꜣ-nḥsj). According to the Oxford Companion to the Bible, "the Bible also uses Egyptian and Nubian names for the land and its people. ... For the Egyptians used to these color variations, the term for their southern neighbors was Neḥesi, 'southerner', which eventually also came to mean 'the black' or 'the Nubian'. This Egyptian root (nḥsj, with the preformative pʾ as a definite article) appears in Exodus 6.25 as the personal name of Aaron's grandson, Phinehas (= Pa-neḥas)". The Theological Wordbook of the Old Testament interprets the name to mean "the bronze-colored one".

== Heresy of Peor ==
A miniature from the 9th-century manuscript Parisinus Graecus 923 depicting Phinehas killing Zimri and Cozbi

The account appears immediately after the story of Balaam, who had been hired by the Moabite chieftain, Balak, to curse the Israelites. Balaam failed to do so, as Yahweh put words in his mouth of blessing for Israel, instead (the first prayer said by Jews as part of their daily prayer service comes from this exact text). Having failed to curse them, Balaam left for his own country. The Book of Numbers asserts a direct connection between Balaam and the events at Peor, stating that the Moabites "caused the children of Israel, through the counsel of Balaam, to commit trespass against the LORD in the matter of Peor".

Moses gave orders to kill all the idolaters, yet Zimri, the son of the Israelite prince Salu from the Tribe of Simeon, openly defied Moses and publicly showed his opinion to those standing at the Tabernacle entrance with Moses by going in to Cozbi, the daughter of the Midianite prince Sur. In a moment of great strength born of holy zeal, Phinehas went after them and ran them through with a spear. He thus "stayed the plague" that had broken out among the people, and by which twenty-four thousand of them had already perished.

Yahweh noticed that Phinehas showed loyalty and bravery for him. Yahweh decided not to destroy all of the children of Israel in anger because Phinehas had made atonement for their sins. Yahweh declared that Phinehas, and his sons' sons for all eternity, would receive divine recognition for this; a covenant of peace and the covenant of an everlasting hereditary priesthood.

The Christian book of Revelation mirrors this sentiment. Revelation describes Jesus as speaking to one of seven Christian churches: "Nevertheless, I have a few things against you: You have people there who hold to the teaching of Balaam, who taught Balak to entice the Israelites to sin by eating food sacrificed to idols and by committing sexual immorality."

Giving a more elaborated version of events, the 1st-century Romano-Jewish historian Flavius Josephus asserts that Balaam sent for Balak and the princes of Midian and told them that, if they wished to bring evil upon Israel, they would have to make the Israelites sin. Balaam advised that they send the most beautiful women to seduce the Israelites to idolatry. This strategy succeeded, and soon many of the Israelites had been seduced.

== Later activities ==
Phinehas later led a 12,000-strong Israelite army against the Midianites to avenge this occasion. Among those slain in the expedition were five Midianite kings, Evi, Rekem, Zur, Hur, and Reba, and also Balaam, son of Beor. According to the Israelite roll-calls, the Israelites did not lose a man in the expedition.

Phinehas son of Eleazar appears again in the book of Joshua. When the tribes of Reuben and Gad, together with the half-tribe of Manasseh, depart to take possession of their lands beyond the Jordan, they build a great altar on the other side; the remainder of the Israelites mistake this for a separatist move to set up a new religious centre, and send Phinehas to investigate.

According to Joshua 24:33, Phinehas owned land in the mountains of Ephraim, where he buried his father.

In addition to these episodes, Phinehas appears as the chief adviser in the war with the Benjamites. He is commemorated in Psalms 106:28–31. According to some rabbinical commentators, Phineas sinned due to his not availing his servitude of Torah instruction to the masses at the time leading up to the Battle of Gibeah. In addition, he also failed to address the needs of relieving Jephthah of his vow to sacrifice his daughter. As consequence, the high priesthood was taken from him and temporarily given to the offspring of Ithamar, essentially Eli and his sons.

According to 1 Chronicles 6:35–38, his relation to Zadok is the following: Phinehas begat Abishua, Abishua begat Bukki, Bukki begat Uzzi, Uzzi begat Zerahiah, Zerahiah begat Meraioth, Meraioth begat Amariah, Amariah begat Ahitub, and Ahitub begat Zadok.

According to 1 Maccabees, he is an ancestor of Matitiyahu.

== Patrilineal ancestry ==
Patrilineal descent
1. Abraham
2. Isaac
3. Jacob
4. Levi
5. Kehath
6. Amram
7. Aaron
8. Eleazar
9. Phinehas

== In Jewish culture ==
Pinechas is the name of the 41st weekly Parashah or portion in the annual Jewish cycle of Torah reading and the eighth in the book of Numbers. The beginning of this parashah tells the judgement of Phinehas son of Eleazar; the end of the previous parashah tells of his zealous act.

The Hebrew expression "One who acts like Zimri and asks for a reward as if he were Phinehas" (עושה מעשה זמרי ומבקש שכר כפנחס) refers to hypocrites who ask for undeserved rewards and honors. It derives from the Babylonian Talmud (Sotah, Ch.22, p. 2), where it is attributed to the Hasmonean King Alexander Jannaeus (see Hebrew Wikipedia עושה מעשה זמרי ומבקש שכר כפנחס).

In some traditions (for example in the Targum Pseudo-Jonathan) Phinehas is identified with Elijah. This identification apparently arose during the first century A.D.

Phinehas
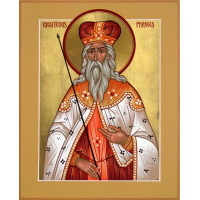

Righteous, High Priest of Israel
- Honored in: Eastern Orthodox Church; Roman Catholic Church
- Feast: 1 July, 1 March (Roman Catholic Church); 12 March (Eastern Orthodox Church)

== Veneration ==
The Roman Catholic Church commemorates him as a saint on 1 July and 1 March. The Eastern Orthodox Church commemorates him as a saint on 12 March (25 March on the New Calendar).

According to Maryanne Vollers, the story of Phinehas is "a great favorite among [Christian] Identity believers...[as] a biblical example of race mixing.... The story has inspired a self-selected, leaderless cult within Identity called the "Phineas Priesthood". Its members consider themselves vigilantes for Christ."

== Sources ==
- Easton, Matthew George (1897). "Phinehas" . Easton's Bible Dictionary (New and revised ed.). T. Nelson and Sons.

Israelite religious titles
| Preceded by Eleazar | High Priest of Israel; Years unknown | Succeeded by Abishua |
