= Abisha III ben Phinhas ben Yitzhaq ben Shalma =

123rd Samaritan High Priest (1943–1961)

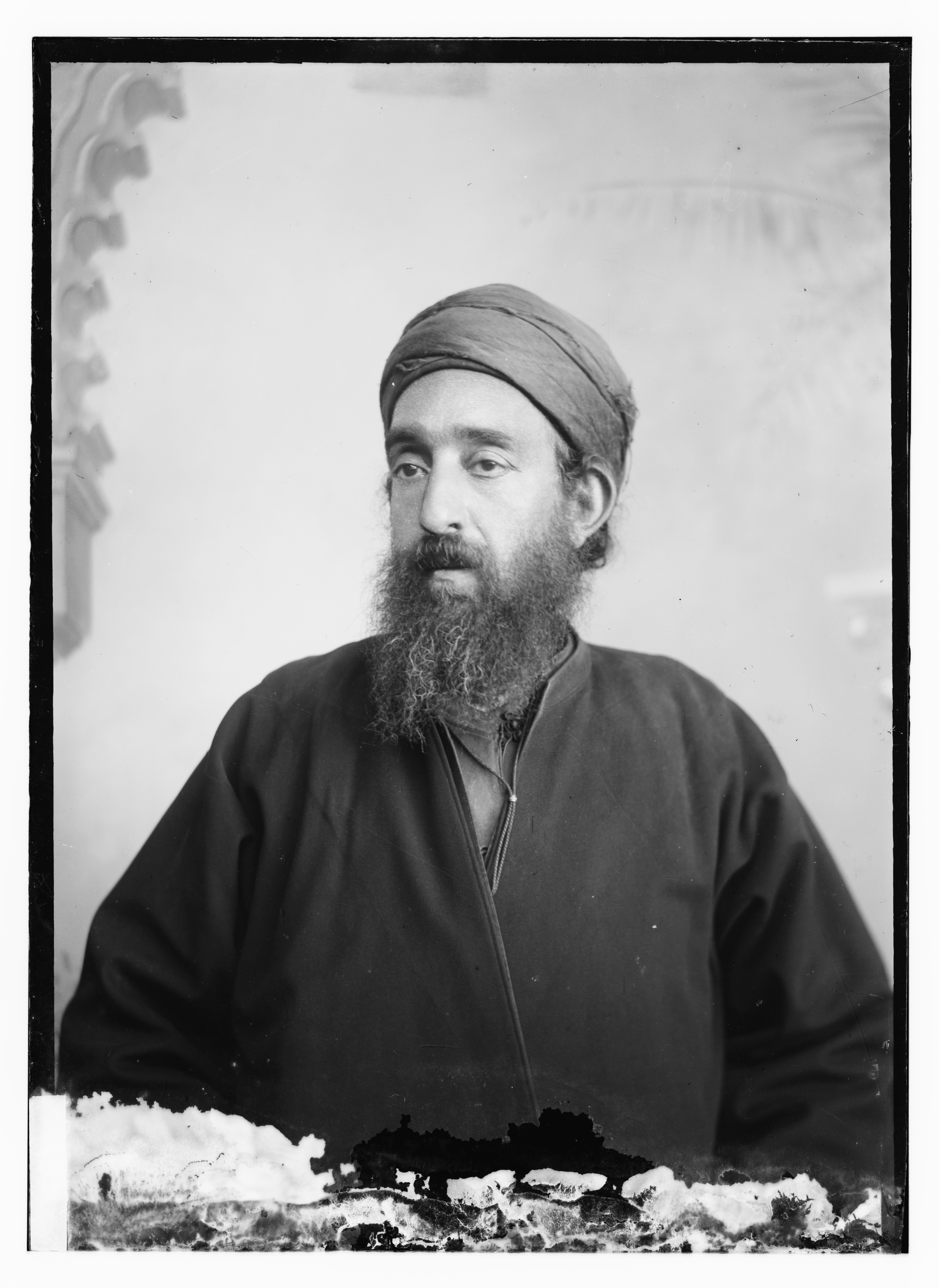
Abisha III

Abisha III ben Phinhas ben Yitzhaq ben Shalma was the 123rd Samaritan High Priest from 1943 to 1961. He is a member of the house of Pinhas, descendants of Pinhas ben Yitzhaq ben Shalma, and brother of the previous high priest Matzliach ben Phinhas ben Yitzhaq ben Shalma.

Preceded by Matzliach ben Phinhas ben Yitzhaq ben Shalma	Samaritan High Priest	Succeeded by Amram IX ben Yitzhaq ben Amram ben Shalma
