= Aabed-El ben Asher ben Matzliach =

133rd Samaritan High Priest (2013–present)

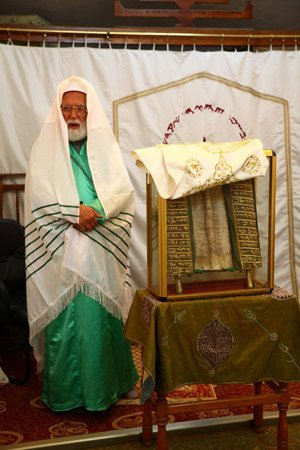
High Priest Aabed-El ben Asher ben Matzliach

Aabed-El ben Asher ben Matzliach (Note: Samaritan Hebrew: ࠏࠢࠁࠝࠃࠀࠢࠋ ࠁࠣࠍ ࠀࠟࠔࠝࠓ ࠁࠣࠍ ࠌࠣࠑࠋࠪࠉࠇࠣ, romanized: Ābədʾēl ban ʾĀ̊šər ban Maṣlīyaʾ; Arabic: عبد الله واصف توفيق. Also spelt Abdel ben Asher ben Masliah. Born Abdullah Wassef Tawfiq.) (born 1935 in Nablus) is the current Samaritan High Priest. He assumed office on 19 April 2013. According to Samaritan tradition, he is the 133rd high priest since Aaron and in accordance with Samaritan custom, upon his death, the office will automatically transfer to the oldest surviving descendant of Ithamar. Aabed-El is married and has two sons and two daughters.

Prior to becoming the High Priest, Aabed-El ran a company that produces Tahini on Mount Gerizim, named "Har Bracha Tahini".

High Priest Aabed-El is the grandson of Matzliach ben Phinhas ben Yitzhaq ben Shalma, who was Samaritan High Priest from 1933 to 1943.

His younger brother, Husney Cohen, is also a priest, and his presumed successor as High Priest.

== Notes ==
Religious titles
| Preceded by Aharon ben Ab-Chisda ben Yaacob | Samaritan High Priest; 2013–present | Incumbent |
