= List of 9th-century religious leaders =

This is a list of the top-level leaders for religious groups with at least 50,000 adherents, and that led anytime from January 1, 801, to December 31, 900. It should likewise only name leaders listed on other articles and lists.

== Christianity ==
- Church of Rome (complete list) –

- Leo III, Pope (795–816)
- Stephen IV, Pope (816–817)
- Paschal I, Pope (817–824)
- Eugene II, Pope (824–827)
- Valentine, Pope (827)
- Gregory IV, Pope (827–844)
- Sergius II, Pope (844–847)
- Leo IV, Pope (847–855)
- Benedict III, Pope (855–858)
- Nicholas I, Pope (858–867)
- Adrian II, Pope (867–872)
- John VIII, Pope (872–882)
- Marinus I, Pope (882–884)
- Adrian III, Pope (884–885)
- Stephen V, Pope (885–891)
- Formosus, Pope (891–896)
- Boniface VI, Pope (896)
- Stephen VI, Pope (896–897)
- Romanus, Pope (897)
- Theodore II, Pope (897)
- John IX, Pope (898–900)
- Benedict IV, Pope (900–903)

- Church of Constantinople (complete list) –

- Tarasius, Patriarch of Constantinople (784–806)
- Nikephoros I, Patriarch of Constantinople (806–815)
- Theodotus I Kassiteras, Patriarch of Constantinople (815–821)
- Antony I, Patriarch of Constantinople (821–836)
- John VII Grammaticus, Patriarch of Constantinople (836–843)
- Methodius I, Patriarch of Constantinople (843–847)
- Ignatius I, Patriarch of Constantinople (847–858, 867–877)
- Photius I the Great, Patriarch of Constantinople (858–867, 877–886)
- Ignatius I, Patriarch of Constantinople (847–858, 867–877)
- Photius I the Great, Patriarch of Constantinople (858–867, 877–886)
- Stephen I, Patriarch of Constantinople (886–893)
- Antony II Kauleas, Patriarch of Constantinople (893–901)

== Islam ==
=== Sunni ===
- Abbasid Caliphate, Baghdad (complete list) –

- Harun al-Rashid, Caliph (786–809)
- al-Amin, Caliph (809–813)
- al-Ma'mun, Caliph (813–833)
- al-Mu'tasim, Caliph (833–842)
- al-Wathiq, Caliph (842–847)
- al-Mutawakkil, Caliph (847–861)
- al-Muntasir, Caliph (861–862)
- al-Musta'in, Caliph (862–866)
- al-Mu'tazz, Caliph (866–869)
- al-Muhtadi, Caliph (869–870)
- al-Mu'tamid, Caliph (870–892)
- al-Mu'tadid, Caliph (892–902)

=== Shia ===
- Twelver Islam

- Imams (complete list) –
- Ali al-Ridha, Imam (799–819)
- Muhammad al-Jawad, Imam (819–835)
- Ali al-Hadi, Imam (835–868)
- Hasan al-Askari, Imam (868–874)
- Muhammad al-Mahdi, Imam (874–present) Shia belief holds that he was hidden by Allah in 874.

- Deputies (complete list) –
- Uthman ibn Sa'id al-Asadi, Deputy (874–880)
- Abu Jafar Muhammad ibn Uthman, Deputy (880–917)

- Isma'ili Islam (complete list) –

- Muhammad ibn Isma'il, Imam (765–813)
- Ahmad al-Wafi, Imam (813–828)
- Muhammad at-Taqi (Ahmed), Imam (828–840)
- Radi Abdullah, Imam (840–881)
- Abdullah al-Mahdi Billah, Imam (881–934)

- Zaidiyyah (complete list) –

Tabaristan
- Hasan ibn Zayd, Emir (864–884)
- Muhammad ibn Zayd, Emir (884–900)
Yemen
- Muhammad ibn Ja'far al-Sadiq, Caliph (815-818)
- al-Hadi ila'l-Haqq Yahya, Imam (897–911)

== Judaism ==
=== Karaite Judaism ===
- Exilarch (complete list) –

- Jehoshaphat ben Saul, Exilarch (early 9th century)
- Boaz ben Jehoshaphat, Exilarch (mid-9th century)

=== Talmudic Academies in Mesopotamia ===
- Pumbedita Academy (complete list) –

- Joseph ben R. Shila, Gaon (798–804)
- Kahana ben Haninai Gaon, Gaon (804–810)
- Abumai Kahana ben Abraham, Gaon (810–814)
- Joseph ben R. Abba, Gaon (814–816)
- Abraham ben R. Sherira, Gaon (816–828)
- Joseph ben Mar R. Hiyya, Gaon (828–833)
- Isaac ben R. Hananiah, Gaon (833–839)
- Joseph ben R. Abba, Gaon (839–841)
- Paltoi ben Abaye, Gaon (841–858)
- Aha Kahana ben Mar Rav (858)
- Menahem ben R. Joseph ben Hiyya, Gaon (858–860)
- Mattithiah ha-Kohen b. Ravrevay b. Hanina, Gaon (860–869)
- Abba ben Ammi ben Samuel, Gaon (869–872)
- Zemah ben Paltoi, Gaon (872–889)
- Hai ben R. David, Gaon (898–890)
- Kimoi ben R. Ahhai, Gaon (896–905)

- Sura Academy (complete list) –

- Rav Abimai, Gaon (815)
- Zadok ben Ashi, Gaon (810–812)
- Hilai ben Hananiah, Gaon (812–816)
- Kimoi ben Ashi, Gaon (816–820)
- Mesharsheya Kahana ben Jacob, Gaon (820–830)
- Kohen Tzedek ben Abimai, Gaon (832–843)
- Sar Shalom ben Boaz, Gaon (843–853)
- Natronai ben Hilai, Gaon (853–861)
- Amram Gaon, Gaon (861–872)
- Nahshon ben Zadok, Gaon (872–879)
- Zemah ben Hayyim, Gaon (879–886)
- Rav Malka, Gaon (886)
- Hai ben Nahshon, Gaon (886–896)
- Hilai ben Natronai ben Hilai, Gaon (896–904)

== See also ==
- Religious leaders by year
- List of state leaders in the 9th century
- Lists of colonial governors by century
