= Haninai Kahana ben R. Huna =

Rav Haninai Kahana ben Rav Huna (Hebrew: רב חנינאי כהנא בן רב הונא) was the Gaon of Sura from 769 to 774.

== Biography ==
Born in the early 8th century, Rav Haninai was elected Gaon in 769. Rav Sherira Gaon states that Rav Haninai was Gaon for five years, later being succeeded by Mari ha-Levi ben Mesharsheya. During his time as Gaon, Rav Haninai wrote down several halakic teachings, many of which have been recorded in Halachot Gedolot. One of his more famous teachings is in regards to Jewish Inheritance law. Rav Haninai is of the opinion that a father may leave in his Will all his properties to any one of his sons - even if not the eldest. This opinion is also shared by Johanan ben Baroka. Rav Haninai was also known to be quite eccentric. Seeing as he was a Kohen, he would often possess incredibly long and sharp fingernails so that when the Third Temple will be built, he may practice Malika (ritually cutting the neck of a chicken using one's fingernails).

Preceded by Ahhunai Kahana ben Papa	Gaon of the Sura Academy; 769-774	Succeeded by Mari ha-Levi ben R. Mesharsheya
