= Aaron ben Meïr =

10th-century Palestinian rabbi

Rabbi Aaron ben Meïr
- אהרון בן מאיר
- Title: Nasi

Personal life
- Parent: Meir (father)
- Era: 10th century
- Notable work: Calendar reform
- Known for: Nasi of the Palestinian Gaonate, Hebrew calendar controversy

Religious life
- Religion: Judaism

Aaron ben Meïr was a rabbi and a Nasi (head of the Sanhedrin) of the Gaonate in the first half of the tenth century. His name was brought to light by several fragments discovered in various genizoth. The fragments contain an account of a controversy between Ben Meïr and the Talmudic Academies in Babylonia regarding the Hebrew calendar.

== Debate concerning reign ==
Sacha Stern (following Shraga Abramson) argues that in fact the ben Meir of the Calendar Controversy was more likely Aaron ben Moses ben Meir, and not this Aaron. Gil believes that the Aaron ben Meir of this article ruled in a co-regency with his father Meir for 14 years.

== Calendrical dispute ==
=== Changing the date of Passover ===
Introducing a new rule in the fixation of the molad (lunar conjunction) of the month of Tishri, Ben Meïr in 921 CE decreed that, in the year 922, Passover and the other Jewish feasts should be celebrated two days before the date prescribed by the traditional calendar. The sage and scholar Saadia Gaon, who was at that time staying at Baghdad, objected, along with the Babylonian academies. Ben Meïr, however, refused to yield to their injunctions, denying them any authority in astronomical matters; and, owing to his own reputation and that of his family, won the confidence of Jews in many countries.

A letter from the exilarch David ben Zakkai and the Babylonian notables was sent to ben Meïr, imploring him not to cause a schism and showing him the fallacy of his calculations with regard to the calendar. Ben Meïr answered in an arrogant fashion, and was then excommunicated by David ben Zakkai and the academies. Circular letters were also sent to various parts of the world, warning the Jews against Ben Meïr's teachings. In this manner an end was made of this agitation.

=== Analysis ===
According to Isaac Broydé in his Jewish Encyclopedia article about Ben Meir, the aim pursued by Ben Meïr in this agitation is obvious. He conceived the project of transferring the dignity of the exilarch from Babylonia back to the Land of Israel, and he endeavored to deprive the exilarchate of one of its most important prerogatives, which was the calculation of the calendar. The moment chosen by ben Meïr was very propitious. The exilarch David ben Zakkai had no authority, being neither a learned man nor a very scrupulous one; and of the two academies at Sura and Pumbedita, the former had no head, and the latter was directed by the ambitious Cohen Zedek.

Ben Meïr's failure was chiefly due to the intervention of Saadia, whose opinion on the subject of discussion, expounded in his Sefer ha-Mo'adim written for that occasion at the request of the exilarch, became authority. The exilarch later rewarded Saadia for the services rendered to him by appointing the latter gaon at Sura, notwithstanding the disinterested advice to the contrary by Nissim Naharwani, who, knowing Saadia, foresaw the collisions.

=== Details ===
Ben Meïr asserted that the first day of Tishrei should be the day of the new moon unless the new moon occurred more than 642 parts (35 2/3 minutes, where a "part" is 1/1080 of an hour or 1/18 of a minute or 3 1/3 seconds) after noon, when it should be delayed by one or two days. He may have been asserting that the calendar should be run according to Jerusalem time, not Babylonian. Local time on the Babylonian meridian was indeed about 642 parts (35 minutes and 40 seconds) later than (ahead of) the meridian of Jerusalem, corresponding to a longitude difference of 8°55'.

An alternative explanation for the 642 parts is that ben Meir may have believed, along with many earlier Jewish scholars, in a Creation theology placing Creation in the spring season, and that the calendar rules had been adjusted by 642 parts to fit in with an autumn date. If Creation occurred in the autumn, to coincide with the observance of Rosh Hashana, the calculated time of new moon during the six days of creation was on Friday at 14 hours exactly (counting from the day starting at 6pm the previous evening). However, if Creation actually occurred six months earlier, in the spring, the new moon would have occurred at 9 hours and 642 parts on Wednesday.

Jewish titles
Preceded by Isaac	Gaon of Aaron Ben Meïr circa 912–926	Succeeded by Abraham ben Aaron
