= Nehar Pekod =

Babylonian Jewish community in the town of Nehardea

Nehar Peḳod (Hebrew: נהר פקוד) was a Babylonian Jewish community in the town of Nehardea. Nehar Pekod was popularized as a center of learning by Rav Hananiah, leading to thousands of Judeans settling in the town after the Bar Kokhba Revolt. Rav Hananiah even tried to establish a bet midrash and a Sanhedrin with the authority to manage and change the Jewish calendar. However, Jewish authorities back in Judea immediately intervened, denouncing the authority of the community. Rav Hananiah died and was buried in Nehar Pekod. The community experienced another era of prominence during the Geonic period when tens of thousands of Surian Jews came to Nehar Pekod to learn. Several notable Sura Gaons were either educated or born in Nehar Pekod, including:

- Hanina of Nehar Pekkod, Sura Gaon from 689 to 694.
- Jacob of Nehar Pekod, Sura Gaon from 712 to 730.
- Mari ha-Kohen of Nehar Pekod, Sura Gaon from 748 to 756.
- Bebai ha-Levi ben R. Abba of Nehar Pekod, Sura Gaon from 778 to 789.

By the 9th century, most of the community had immigrated back to Sura.
