= Eldad ha-Dani =

9th-century Jewish merchant, traveler, and philologist

Eldad ben Maḥli ha-Dani
- אֶלְדָּד בֶּן מַחְלִי הַדָּנִי
- Born: c. 851
- Died: c. 900
- Occupations: Merchant, traveler, philologist
- Known for: Spreading accounts of the Ten Lost Tribes and unique halakhot
- Notable work: Sefer Eldad

Eldad ben Maḥli ha-Dani (Hebrew: אֶלְדָּד בֶּן מַחְלִי הַדָּנִי, lit. 'Eldad son of Mahli the Danite') (fl. c. 851 – c. 900) was a ninth-century Jewish merchant, traveller, and philologist. Though probably originally from South Arabia, he professed to be a citizen of an "independent Jewish state" in East Africa, inhabited by people claiming descent from the lost Tribes of Dan, Asher, Gad, and Naphtali. Eldad visited Babylonia, Kairouan, and Iberia, where he spread his accounts of the Ten Lost Tribes and halakhot which he claimed he had brought from his native country.

Eldad's Hebrew narrative Sefer Eldad established his reputation as a philologist whom leading medieval Jewish grammarians and lexicographers quoted as an authority on linguistic difficulties. His halakhot, which deal with the laws of shechita, differ in many places from the Talmudic ordinances but have similarities with the halakhot of the Beta Israel. Eldad's halakhot are introduced in the name of Joshua ben Nun, or, according to another version, of Othniel Ben Kenaz. Eldad's accounts soon spread, and, as usual in such cases, were remolded and amplified by copyists and editors. There are numerous differing versions in several languages.

== Eldad's account ==
Eldad's story begins with him leaving the land "on the other side of the river of Kush." Eldad traveled with a man of the tribe of Asher. A great storm wrecked the boat, but God prepared a box for him and his companion, on which they floated until they were thrown ashore among a cannibal Ethiopian tribe called Romrom. The Asherite, who was fat, was immediately eaten, while Eldad was put into a pit to fatten. Soon after, a fire-worshiping tribe assailed the cannibals, and Eldad was taken prisoner. He remained in captivity for four years. His captors brought him to the province of Azanian (according to another version, to China). He was ransomed to a Jewish merchant from the tribe of Issachar for thirty-two pieces of gold.

Now with the Tribe of Issachar, who "live in peace and comfort and there is no disturber and no evil chance" under the leadership of a prince called Naḥshon, Eldad dwelled among high mountains near Media and Persia. The Tribe of Zebulon occupies the land extending from the province of Armenia to the River Euphrates. Behind the mountains of Paran the tribe of Reuben faces them. Peace reigns between these two tribes; they war as allies and divide the spoils. They possess command of the Bible, the Mishnah, the Talmud, and the Aggadah. The Tribe of Ephraim and half of the Tribe of Manasseh dwell in the mountains of Southern Arabia, and are very warlike. The Tribe of Simeon and the other half of the Tribe of Manasseh are in the land of the Babylonians. They take tribute from twenty-five kingdoms, and some Ishmaelites pay them tribute. He states the tribe of Simeon is the most numerous of all the tribes.

The tribe of Dan emigrated to the land of gold, Havilah (Kush), shortly after the separation of Judah and Israel. The tribes of Naphtali, Gad, and Asher joined the Danites later. They have a king called Adiel ben Malkiel, a prince by the name of Elizaphan of the house of Elihab, and a judge named Abdan ben Mishael, who has the power to inflict the four capital punishments prescribed in the Law. The four tribes lead a nomadic life, and are continually at war with the five neighboring Ethiopian kings. Each tribe is in the field three months, and every warrior remains in the saddle without dismounting from one Sabbath to the next.

They possess the entire Scriptures, but they do not read the Book of Esther nor Lamentations. They have a Talmud in original Hebrew, but none of the Talmudic teachers are mentioned. Their ritual is introduced in the name of Joshua, who had received it from Moses, who in his turn had heard its contents from the Almighty. They speak only Hebrew. Eldad professed not to understand a word of Amharic or Arabic.

On "the other side of the river of Kush" dwell the Bnei Moshe, encircled by the River Sambation. It rolls sand and stones during the six working days and rests on the Sabbath. From the first moment of Sabbath to the last, fire surrounds the river, and during that time no human being can approach within half a mile of either side of it. The four other tribes communicate with the Bnei Moshe from the borders of the river. The Bnei Moshe dwell in beautiful houses, and no unclean animal is found in their land. Their cattle and sheep as well as their fields bear twice a year. No child dies during the lifetime of its parents, who live to see a third and fourth generation. They do not close their houses at night, for there is no theft or wickedness among them. They speak Hebrew, and never swear by the name of God.

== Reception ==
=== Contemporaneous opinions ===
This fanciful narrative was largely accepted by his contemporaries as true. Its origins are to be found in the aggadic literature, of which Eldad must have had a very extensive knowledge. The inhabitants of Kairouan were troubled by the differences between his halakhot and those of the Talmud, and by some of his strange Hebrew words. Eldad pretended to speak only Hebrew; however, many of the words in his letters are derived from Arabic, suggesting that he may have understood other languages as well. The gaon Ẓemaḥ ben Hayyim of Sura, whose opinion they had asked, soothed them by saying that there was nothing astonishing in the four tribes disagreeing with the Talmud on some halakic points.

Eldad was known to the Gaon through Isaac ben Mar and R. Simḥah, with whom the Danite associated while he was in Babylonia. Hisdai ibn Shaprut cites Eldad in his letter to the king of the Khazars, and Eldad's halakhot were used by both Rabbinites and Karaites as weapons in defense of their respective creeds. Halakhic authorities like Isaac ben Abba Mari, Moses ben Jacob of Coucy, and Abraham Maimonides treated Eldad as a legitimate source of halakha which needs to be reckoned with although they didn't necessarily accept his positions. Lexicographers and grammarians interpret some Hebrew words according to the meaning given them in Eldad's phraseology. However, many writers of the Middle Ages expressed doubts as to the genuineness of Eldad's narrative and his halakhot, most explicitly Abraham ibn Ezra (Commentary to Exodus ii. 22) and Meir of Rothenburg (Responsa, no. 193). Many Rishonim and Acharonim including the Radbaz and Rabbi Obadiah ben abraham thought the people Eldad was referring with was the Beta Israel.

=== 19th century opinions ===
Nineteenth-century critics were divided in their opinions concerning Eldad. Simhah Pinsker, Heinrich Grätz, and Adolf Neubauer believed he was a Karaite missionary, allegedly endeavouring to discredit the Talmud through his statement that the four tribes did not know the names of the Tannaim and Amoraim, and that their halakhot were different from those of the Talmud. This opinion was refuted by Moses Schorr and Adolf Jellinek, who observed that Eldad's halakhot contain rules of shechita not accepted by the Karaites. P. F. Frankl regarded Eldad as a mere charlatan whose sayings and doings were not worth attention. Jacob Reifmann denied outright the existence of Eldad, and considered the letters of the community of Kairwan and of Ẓemaḥ ben Ḥayyim of Sura to be forgeries.

Metz was the first to analyze the contents of Eldad's book in the light of the reports of other travellers. Abraham Epstein followed Metz's method, and came to the conclusion that Eldad's book is like a historical novel in which truth is mixed with fiction. According to Epstein, the Halakhot and laws described by Eldad are genuine, and were in use among the countrymen of Eldad, According to Abraham Epstein and majority of the scholars thought the halakhot of Eldad was parallel with the halakhot of the Beta Israel.

Later authors have made the connection between the Jewish names Eldad mentioned in his travels to a codex published in the mid-twentieth century. Eldad's account includes very biblical names for the people of his tribe, such as Uzziel, Adiel, and Abdon, and even his own. While these names do not seem to appear in post-biblical literature, possibly lending credence to the claim that Eldad was, in fact, a fraud; they, or their equivalents, do appear in the codex from Kaifeng published in Chinese Jews by W. C. White, which connects the Jews in China to those from Persia.

== Relationship to "Prester John" letters ==
The influence of Eldad's narrative extended beyond Jewish circles, and some sources link it to the Prester John letters. Perhaps intending to refute Eldad's assertion of the existence of independent Jewish states—an assertion contrary to the teaching of the Roman-Catholic Church—the presumably Christian writer claimed to be a priest (Prester John) who ruled over the great kingdom of Ethiopia. According to the letters, Prester John's subjects included some Jewish tribes, such as the Bnei Moshe who dwelt beyond the River Sambation.

== Editions ==
Eldad's travels have been published from the various existing versions: Mantua (1480); Constantinople (1516, 1519); Venice (1544, 1605, 1648); Fürth, with a Yiddish translation by S. H. Weil (1769); Zolkiev (1772); Jessnitz (1772); Leghorn (1828); and Presburg (1891). Eldad's narrative was translated into Latin by Gilbert Génébrard (Paris, 1584), and anonymously, into Arabic (St. Petersburg MSS. nos. 674, 703) and into German (Dessau, 1700; Jessnitz, 1723). An English translation can be found in Elkan Adler's Jewish Travellers in the Middle Ages: 19 Firsthand Accounts (1930, repr. 1987).

== See also ==
- History of the Jews in Kairouan
- David Reubeni
- Jewish Messiah claimants
