= Moses Shirvani =

Moses (Mūsā) ben Aaron ben Sheʾerit Shīrvānī was a Jewish writer who authored a Hebrew/Aramaic–Persian dictionary in 1459 in Shirvan (present-day Republic of Azerbaijan). The dictionary's title, Agron, is Hebrew, and means "glossary, lexicon". According to Vera B. Moreen in the Encyclopedia of Jews in the Islamic World, the title of Shirvani's work is "undoubtedly derived" from the more famous eponymous work written by Saadia Gaon (died 942). Shirvani wrote the Agron as a helping hand in the study of the Bible, and also incorporated vocabulary from the Bible. Moreen notes that the work is mostly organized "according to Hebrew roots and nouns". The Agron has survived only through manuscripts, none of which are complete.
