= Hai ben David =

Ninth-century rabbi

Rabbi Hai ben David (Hebrew: האי בן דוד) was a late 9th-century rabbi of the Geonic period, who served as the Gaon (dean) of Pumbedita Academy from 890 to 897, and was known for his anti-Karaitic stance.

== Biography ==
Prior to his appointment, R. Hai ben David had served as a rabbinic judge in Baghdad, possibly at the court of the Exilarchs. After the death of the previous Gaon of Pumbedita, R. Zemah ben Paltoi in 980, R. Hai was offered the Gaonate of Pumbedita, which he accepted later that year. Soon after his appointment, R. Hai moved the academy to Baghdad, which was under Abbasid rule at the time. R. Hai is mentioned in Isaac ibn Ghayyat's "Halakot," which states that R. Hai unsuccessfully attempted to abolish the Baghdad custom of reciting the Avodah on the morning of Yom Kippur. According to contested Karaitic sources, R. Hai had written an anti-Karaitic book with the purpose of justifying the Rabbinite calendar, however some have argued that his authorship is confused with R. Hai Gaon.

Preceded by Zemah ben Paltoi	Gaon of the Pumbedita Academy; 872-889	Succeeded by Kimoi ben Ahhai
