= Mar ben Huna =

Mar ben R. Huna (Hebrew: מר בר רב הונא or Mar b. Huna or Mar bar Huna) (died 614 [ד'שע"ד, Hebrew calendar] or 620 [ד'ש"פ, Hebrew calendar]) was one of the first Gaons, and head of the Sura Academy in Babylon at the end of the rule of the Sassanid Empire.

He led the re-opening of the Sura Academy (year 591; ד'שנ"א, Hebrew calendar; or some believe year 609; ד'שס"ט, Hebrew calendar). After some 50 years it became inactive due to Anti-Jewish decrees and pogroms during the Jewish Savora sages era. Mar ben Huna was, according to one opinion based on Iggeret Rav Sherira Gaon, the first Gaon of the Sura Academy, and according to another opinion, one of the Savora sages.

Preceded by New title	Gaon of the Sura Academy around 591	Succeeded by R. Hanina
