= Bebai ha-Levi ben Abba of Nehar Pekod =

Babylonian rabbi (d. 789)

Rav Bebai ha-Levi ben Rav Abba
- רב ביבוי הלוי בר אבא מנהר פקוד

Personal life
- Born: Early 8th century Nehar Pekod
- Died: 789
- Era: 8th century
- Known for: Gaon of Sura
- Other name: Rav Bibi (רב ביבי)

Religious life
- Religion: Judaism

Senior posting
- Based in: Sura, Babylonia
- Predecessor: Mari ha-Levi ben R. Mesharsheya
- Successor: Hilai ben Mari

Rav Bebai ha-Levi ben Rav Abba of Nehar Pekod (Hebrew: רב ביבוי הלוי בר אבא מנהר פקוד) also known as Rav Bibi (רב ביבי) was the Gaon of Sura from 778 up until his death in 789.

== Biography ==
Born in the early 8th century, in his early years Rav Bibi studied in Nehar Pekod, later moving to Pumbedita where he gained prominence in the community. He was elected to the Gaonate of Sura in 778, succeeding Mari ha-Levi ben R. Mesharsheya. During his tenure as Gaon, Rav Bibi implemented several halakic economic reforms which were in response to the growing decline of land ownership and agriculturalism amongst Babylonian Jewry. Some have identified Rav Bibi as the author of Meat on Charcoals, but many others have discredited this. Rav Bibi died in 789, and was succeeded as Gaon by Hilai ben Mari.

Preceded by Mari ha-Levi ben Mesharsheya	Gaon of the Sura Academy; 778-789	Succeeded by Hilai ben Mari
