= Abraham ben Aaron =

Palestinian Gaonate head in the 10th century

- אברהם בן אהרן
- Title: Gaon

Personal life
- Era: 10th century
- Known for: Head of the Palestinian Gaonate

Religious life
- Religion: Judaism

Jewish leader
- Predecessor: Aaron ben Meir (assumed)

Abraham ben Aaron (Hebrew: אברהם בן אהרן) was a head of the Palestinian Gaonate in the 10th century.

== Details ==
Moshe Gil assumes that this Abraham was the son of Aaron ben Meir. According to a fragment found in the Cairo Genizah (T-S 312.82), Abraham reigned as Gaon for seven years. Gil estimates his reign to have occurred around 926-933 CE. Abraham Gaon was the ancestor of members of the Palestinian Gaonate, including Josiah ben Aaron Ab and his son Sadoq ben Josiah. Additionally, the family traced their lineage to Rabbi Judah the Prince.

Jewish titles
Preceded by Aaron ben Meir	Gaon of Palestine; Abraham ben Aaron circa 926–933	Succeeded by Aaron ha-Cohen (Gaon)
