= Aaron ha-Cohen =

Palestinian Gaonate Head

- אהרן הכהן
- Title: Gaon

Personal life
- Era: 10th century
- Known for: Head of the Palestinian Gaonate

Religious life
- Religion: Judaism

Jewish leader
- Predecessor: Abraham ben Aaron

Aaron ha-Cohen (Hebrew: אהרן הכהן) was a head of the Palestinian Gaonate in the 10th century.

== Details ==
According to a fragment found in the Cairo Genizah (T-S 312.82), Aaron ha-Cohen reigned as Gaon after Abraham ben Aaron (the edge of the fragment is cut and does not allow for reconstruction of the length of his reign). It is possible that he is the Aaron ha-Cohen who wrote a calligraphic invitation to a certain elder Suwayd and his son to come to a lecture on the Sabbath.

This Aaron ha-Cohen should be distinguished from a different Aaron ha-Cohen who served under Joseph ben Ezrun ha-Cohen later in the 10th century.

Jewish titles
| Preceded by Abraham ben Aaron | Gaon of Palestine; Aaron Ha-Cohen circa 933 | Succeeded by Joseph ben Ezrun ha-Cohen |
