= Abba ben Ammi =

Babylonian rabbi (d. 872)

Rav Abba ben Ammi ben Samuel
- רב אבא בר אמי בן שמואל
- Title: Gaon

Personal life
- Born: c. 799
- Died: 872
- Parent: Ammi ben Samuel (father)
- Era: 9th century
- Known for: Gaon of Pumbedita

Religious life
- Religion: Judaism

Jewish leader
- Predecessor: Mattithiah ha-Kohen
- Successor: Zemah ben Paltoi

Rav Abba ben Rav Ammi ben Samuel (Hebrew: רב אבא בר אמי בן שמואל; c. 799 - 872) was the Gaon of Pumbedita from 869 until his death in 872.

== Biography ==
Born in about 799 to an affluent family. His grandfather, Rav Samuel ben Mar Mari was the Sura Gaon from 730 to 748 and a descendant of the Exilarchs. He studied under the previous Gaon, Mattithiah ha-Kohen, who appointed Rav Abba as his successor in 869. Rav Abba served as the Pumbedita Gaon for two years and was succeeded by Zemah ben Paltoi.

Preceded by Mattithiah ha-Kohen b. Ravrevay b. Hanina	Gaon of the Pumbedita Academy; 869-872	Succeeded by Zemah ben Paltoi
