= Nahshon ben Zadok =

Rabbi and Head of the Academy of Sura

- נחשון בן צדוק

Personal life
- Parent: Zadok (father)
- Era: Geonic period
- Notable work(s): Explanations to difficult words in the Talmud, Re'umah (ascribed)

Religious life
- Religion: Judaism

Nahshon ben Zadok Gaon (Hebrew: נחשון בן צדוק or sometimes: Nahshon b. Zadok) was head of the Academy of Sura from 874 to 882, in succession to Mar Amram ben Sheshna. He wrote explanations to difficult words in the Talmud, not in alphabetical order, as did his contemporary Gaon Ẓemaḥ ben Paltoi of Pumbedita, but in the order of the tractates. The Re'umah, on ritual slaughtering (Constantinople, 1566), is ascribed to him, but his authorship is doubtful.

He devoted much attention to the study of the Jewish calendar. He is said to have found that the order of the week-days on which any particular festival occurs in successive years repeats itself after a cycle of 247 years, and that the years with regard to their characteristic dates can be arranged in 14 tables. This erroneous notion is known as, and is contained in, the Iggul [Cycle] di R. Nahshon, which work was printed with the She'erit Yosef of Joseph b. Shem-Ṭob b. Joshua (1521). Nahshon and his son Hai Gaon did not approve of saying the "Kol Nidre" on the eve of Yom Kippur.

Most of his responsa, contained in the collection Sha'are Ẓedeḳ, are written in Aramaic in a curt, difficult style; but the responsa ascribed to him in Teshubot Ge'onim Ḳadmonim are written in mixed Hebrew in a plain, easy diction. Some of his decisions conflict with the Talmud, and in his haggadic interpretations he did not always agree with the older haggadists. He was greatly respected by his contemporaries.

Preceded by Amram Gaon	Gaon of the Sura Academy; 872-879	Succeeded by Zemah ben Hayyim
