= Amram ben Sheshna =

Babylonian rabbi (d. 875)

Mar-Rav Amram bar Sheshna Gaon
- עמרם בר ששנא
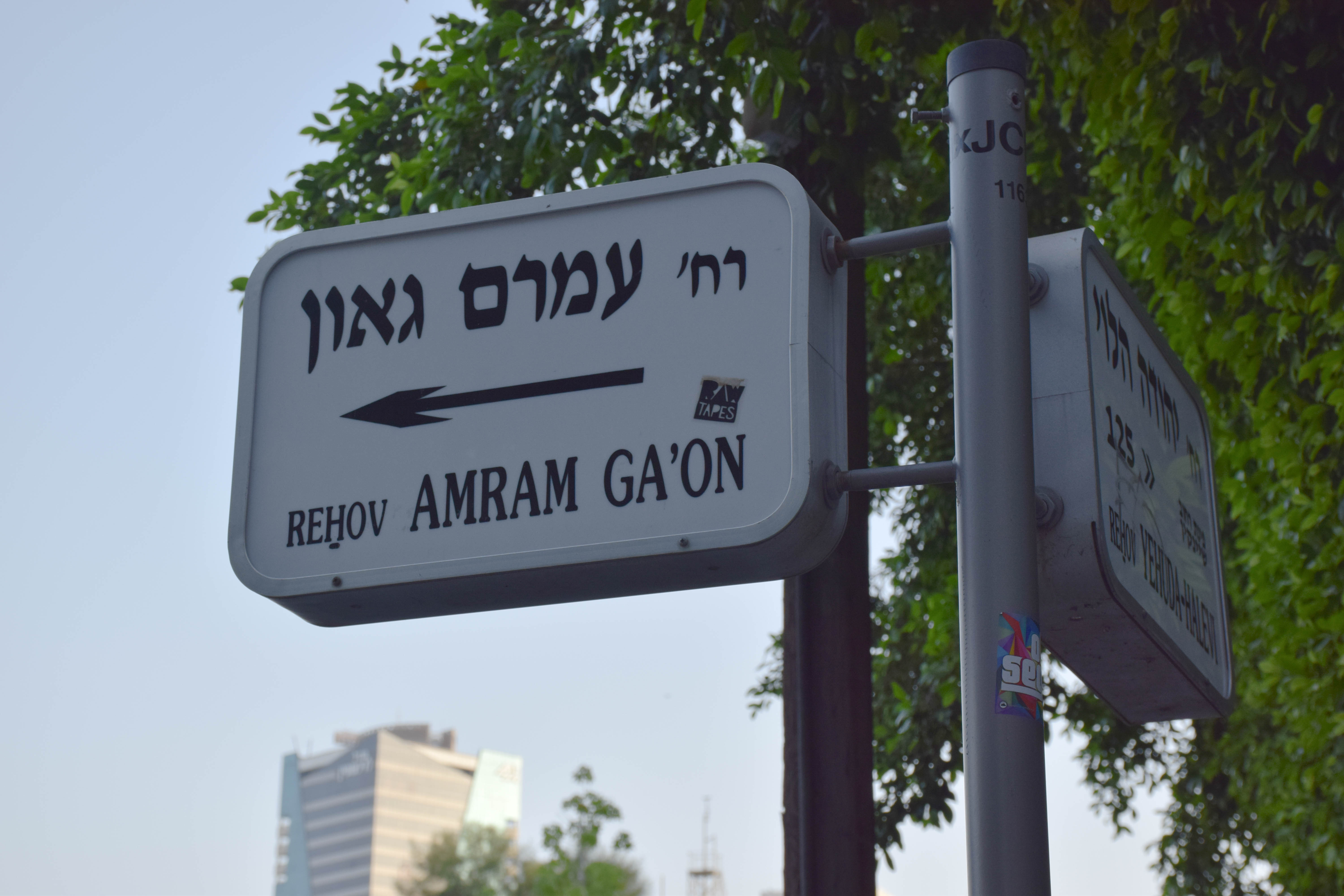
- A street sign at the intersection of Amram Ga'on and HaHashmona'im streets in Tel Aviv
- Title: Gaon of Academy of Sura

Personal life
- Died: 875 Sura, Lower Mesopotamia
- Era: 9th century
- Notable work: Siddur Rav Amram (Seder Rav Amram)
- Known for: First to arrange a complete liturgy for the synagogue, author of Siddur Rav Amram
- Other name: Amram Gaon

Religious life
- Religion: Judaism

Amram bar Sheshna or Amram Gaon (Jewish Babylonian Aramaic: עמרם בר ששנא; Hebrew: עמרם גאון; d. 875) was a gaon (or 'head') of the Academy of Sura in Lower Mesopotamia in the ninth century CE.

He authored many responsa, but his chief work was liturgical. He was the first to arrange a complete liturgy for the synagogue. His siddur (Siddur Rav Amram or Seder Rav Amram), which took the form of a long responsum to the Jews of al-Andalus, is still extant and was an important influence on most of the current rites in use among Orthodox Jews.

== Biography ==
Amram bar Sheshna was a pupil of gaon of Sura Natronai ben Hilai and was exceptionally honored with the title of gaon within the lifetime of his teacher. Eventually, he broke away from ben Hilai and started his own school. Upon ben Hilai's death (c. 857), the title, dignities, and responsibilities of the gaonate were conferred upon bar Sheshna, which he held for 18 years until his death.

== Responsa ==
He is the author of about 120 responsa, most of which were published in Salonica in 1792 in a collection entitled Sha'arei Tzedek, touching almost every aspect of Jewish jurisprudence. They afford insight into Amram's personality as well as the religious practice of Jews of that period. For example, he ruled that interest may not be exacted from non-Jews—that even such minor profits as interest the Talmud terms as "dust" are allowed only when customary in non-Jewish business circles. It is characteristic of Amram's method to avoid extreme stringency. Therefore, he decided that a slave who embraced Judaism but desired to postpone circumcision until he ft strong enough for it could not be hurried. He combats superstition and places himself almost in opposition to the Talmud when he protests that there is no sense in fasting on account of bad dreams, given that the true nature of dreams is unknown. Amram's rules concerning the methodology of the Talmud are of considerable value.

Amram responded to a query from a Jewish community in al-Andalus regarding synagogue practice, and his reply became the basis for the Sephardic prayer tradition.

== Siddur Rav Amram ==
The most important work of Amram, marking him as one of the most prominent of the geonim before Saadiah, is his prayer book, the so-called Siddur Rav Amram. Amram was the first to arrange a complete liturgy for use in synagogue and home. His book forms the foundation both of the Spanish-Portuguese and of the German-Polish liturgies, and has exerted great influence upon Jewish religious practice for more than a thousand years, an influence which to some extent is still felt at the present day. For Amram did not content himself with giving the mere text of the prayers, but in a species of running commentary added many Talmudic and gaonic regulations relating to the prayers and their associated ceremonies. His siddur, which was made familiar by the many excerpts quoted from it by the medieval liturgical writers, and which served as the model for Saadia's and Maimonides' own prayer texts, was published complete for the first time in Warsaw, in the year 1865 under the title Siddur Rav Amram Gaon.

The work as published is composed of two parts. The second part containing the selichot and pizmonim for the month of Elul, for Rosh Hashana and Yom Kippur, is certainly not the work of Amram, but appears to belong to a much later period. Even the first portion, which contains the prayers proper, is full of interpolations, some of which, such as the kedushah for private prayer, are evidently later additions in the manuscripts. But not much weight can be attached even to portions of the book which are specifically given under the name of Amram; many of the explanations are certainly not by him, but by the editors who appended his name to them, speaking of him in the third person. These explanations of the prayers make no reference to any authorities later than the following: Natronai II, Amram's teacher (17 times); Shalom, Natronai's predecessor in the gaonate (7 times); Judah, Paltoi, Zadok, and Moses, geonim before Amram (once each); Cohen Tzedek (twice); Nahshon and Tzemach, contemporaries of Amram (twice each); and Nathan of unknown date. The only authority mentioned of later date than Amram is Saadia. This indicates that the additions to the text of the prayers must have originated in Amram's time. Certainty on this point, however, can only be obtained by a comparison of the printed text with the manuscripts; that of Almanzi, according to the specimens given by Luzzatto, varies considerably from the printed text. Israel ben Todros (1305) mentions some azharot as having been composed by Amram; but no trace of these can now be found.

=== The text ===
No early manuscripts of this prayer book survive, and later manuscripts appear to be heavily edited to conform with the rites in use at the time: we therefore cannot be certain of the exact wording preferred by Amram Gaon himself. Evidence for this is:

- The manuscripts differ widely among themselves
- The text of the prayers often differs from the surviving responsa of Natronai Gaon and other contemporary authorities, and occasionally even with the halachic commentary of the siddur itself
- There are many instances where a later authority, such as Abraham ben Nathan's Sefer ha-Manhig or David Abudirham, argues for text A "as prescribed by Amram Gaon" as against text B "found in popular usage", but the current version of Amram Gaon shows text B.

=== Relation to current rites ===
The Siddur Rav Amram was originally sent to the communities of Spain, in response to a request for guidance on the laws of prayer. However, it never seems to have been adopted by them as a package deal, though they respected the individual halachic rulings contained in it. On the contrary, they appear to have edited it to suit their own requirements, so that the wording of the manuscripts and the printed version often contains variants likely to be derived from early versions of the Spanish rite. None of these early versions survives, but secondary evidence such as the Sefer ha-Manhig and the Siddur Rav Amram itself indicates that in certain respects these were different from the Sephardic rite in use today and nearer to other old European rites such as the Provençal, Italian and Old French rites, which reflect varying degrees of Palestinian influence. The later Sephardic rite has been revised to bring it into closer conformity with the rulings of the halachic codes, which themselves often reflect the opinions of the Geonim, and is therefore of a more purely Babylonian character: thus, paradoxically, it has moved away from the current wording of the Siddur Rav Amram and towards what was presumably its original wording.

Conversely, the Siddur Rav Amram was a major source used in the standardization of the nusach Ashkenaz, which was already akin to the old European family. For this reason, to a modern reader the wording of the Siddur Rav Amram appears far closer to an Ashkenazi than a Sephardi text, a fact which misled Moses Gaster into believing that the Ashkenazi rite was based on the Babylonian while the Sephardic rite was essentially Israeli.

=== Published texts of the Siddur ===
- Seder Rab Amram, ed. Coronel: Warsaw 1865
- Seder Rav Amram Gaon, ed. Hedegard: Lund 1951
- Seder Rav Amram Gaon, ed. Goldschmidt: Jerusalem 1971
- Seder Rav Amram Gaon, ed. Kronholm: Lund 1974
- Seder Rav Amram Gaon, ed. Harfenes: Bene Berak 1994

Preceded by Natronai ben Hilai	Gaon of the Sura Academy; 861-872	Succeeded by Nahshon ben R. Zadok
