= Joseph ben Jacob =

Joseph ben Rav Jacob HaKohen (Hebrew: רבי יוסף בן רב יעקב הכהן) commonly known as bar Saṭya (Hebrew: בר סטיא; c. 902 - 969) was the Gaon of Sura from 930 to 936 and again from 942 to 948.

== Biography ==
Joseph was born c. 902 in Sura. His father Jacob ben Natronai was the Gaon of Sura from 911 to 924, and his mother descended from the Exilarchs. Much of his early life is unknown, although in 930, the Exilarch David ben Zakkay appointed Rabbi Joseph as the Sura Gaon in retaliation to the previous Gaon, Saadia, with whom David got into a heated dispute, regarding Saadia's support for the succession of David's brother as Exilarch. Because Joseph became Gaon under such political tension, many regarded him as a pawn of the Exilarch, unfit to serve as the Sura Gaon. The Sherira Gaon describes Joseph stating that: "he was not very eloquent and was a trifling scholar compared to R. Saadia Gaon”. After Saadia and David reconciled, Joseph was promptly replaced by Saadia. Although he continued to receive a pension from the academy, and after Saadia's death in 942, he once again served as the Sura Gaon until 948, after which he moved to Basra, where he died around 960.

Preceded by Saadia ben Joseph	Gaon of the Sura Academy; 930-936/942-948	Succeeded by Zemah Tzedek ben Paltoi ben Isaac
