= Jacob of Nehar Pekod =

Babylonian rabbi (fl. 712–730)

Jacob HaKohen of Nehar Peḳkod (Hebrew: רבי יעקב הכהן מנהר פקוד ) was the Gaon of Sura from 712 to 730.

Born in the late 7th century, Jacob was one of several community members who settled in Nehar Pekod. It was here that Jacob attained most of his schooling. He later migrated back to Sura, where he was elected head of the Gaonate, succeeding Rav Sheshna. Most scholars (particularly Rav Sherira Gaon) agree that Jacob served as Sura Gaon for eighteen years, although others state sixteen.

Preceded by Hillai of Naresh	Gaon of the Sura Academy; 712 - 730	Succeeded by Rav Samuel
