= Agron (dictionary) =

Lexicographical reference book for payṭanim

The Agron (Hebrew: הָאֶגְרוֹן, romanized: hā-ʾEḡron) was Saadia Gaon's first work, completed in 913 CE, when he was 20 years old. The book is also known by its Judeo-Arabic name אצול אלשער אלעבראני "The Rudiments of Hebrew Poetry". The Agron is not a Hebrew language dictionary; it does not define the different meanings of words or radicals. Instead, it is a lexicographical reference book for payṭanim, which includes in its first section words arranged alphabetically by first letter for use in making acrostics at the beginning of the poetic line; in the second section are words arranged alphabetically by last letter (syllable), for use in making rhymes at the end of the poetic line. The work consisted of two parts and was intended to be used in versification, in which acrostics and rhyme were the chief requisites. In a later edition, Saadia added the Arabic translation of each word, and also included passages concerning various "memorable subjects of the poets," and named the work in its new form "Kitab al-Shi'r." The Arabic introduction to the second edition and the Hebrew preface of the first have been in great part preserved. Saadia's The Agron is considered a dictionary because in his preface he described himself and his work as the "collector" and collection of the Hebrew language.

The word agron, as אגרון entered Hebrew to refer to thesaurus texts which also define words for practical use. A 2006 lookup database which distributed personal details of millions of Israelis stolen from government records was also called Agron.

== See also ==
- Moses Shirvani
- Rhyming dictionary
