= Ahai of Shabha =

8th-century Jewish scholar

Achai Gaon
- רב אחא [אחאי] משַׁבָּחָא

Personal life
- Born: Babylonia
- Died: c. 752 or 753 Land of Israel
- Era: 8th century
- Known for: Author of the She'iltot

Religious life
- Religion: Judaism

Achai Gaon (also known as Ahai of Shabḥa or Aha of Shabḥa, Hebrew: רב אחא [אחאי] משַׁבָּחָא) was a leading scholar during the period of the Geonim, an 8th-century Talmudist of high renown. He enjoys the distinction of being the first rabbinical author known to history after the completion of the Talmud. Ahai of Shabha is the author of the She'iltot.

As he never actually became the Gaon of either of the two academies, the description "Gaon" attached to his name is a misnomer. When the gaon of Pumbedita died, Aḥa was universally acknowledged to be the fittest man to succeed him. But a personal grudge entertained by the exilarch Solomon bar Ḥasdai induced the latter to pass over Aḥa, and to appoint Natroi Kahana ben Amuna, Aḥa's underling, a man considerably his inferior in learning and general acquirements. Angered by this slight, Aḥa left Babylonia and settled in Israel, about 752 or 753, where he remained until his death. Despite Steinschneider's erroneous assertion that he died in 761, the exact date of his death is unknown.

== Aḥa's Sheiltot ==
The Sheiltot (שאלתות), also known as Sheiltot d’Rav Achai or Sheiltos, is a collection of homilies (at once learned and popular) on Jewish law and ethics, written by Aḥa.

After R. Shemuel bar Mari there was R. Aḥa of Shabḥa and he was an exceptionally wise man, and who compiled his She'iltot (Inquiries), drawn from the entire commandments mentioned in the Torah. The book is, unto this day, found among us, and all those who came after him have examined it and scrutinized it, while we have heard that, unto this day, there is not found in it any error whatsoever. Even so, the said R. Aḥa of Shabḥa was not ordained as a Gaon because of the hatred borne to him by the exilarch in that same generation. Wherefore, he laid hands on (ordained) the underling of R. Aḥa whose name was R. Natronai, and R. Aḥa became angry [at this appointment] and departed Babylonia to go up to the Land of Israel where he died.

== See also ==
- Full text of the Sheiltot online (Hebrew)

Preceded by Mari ha-Kohen of Nehar Pekod	Gaon of the Sura Academy; 756	Succeeded by Yehudai ben Nahman
