= Kutub al-Lughah =

Kutub al-Lughah is a work of Hebrew linguistics by Saadia Gaon (892–942). It is the oldest known work focused on the grammar of Hebrew. Only fragments of it have survived.
