= Kohen Tzedek ben Abimai =

Rav Kohen Tzedek ben Abimai HaKohen
- רב כהן צדק בן איבומאי הכהן

Personal life
- Born: c. 816
- Died: 848
- Parent: Rav Abimai (father)
- Era: 9th century
- Notable work(s): Liturgical rulings, responsa on circumcision and Shacharit
- Known for: Gaon of Sura

Religious life
- Religion: Judaism

Senior posting
- Based in: Sura, Babylonia
- Predecessor: Mesharsheya Kahana ben Jacob
- Successor: Sar Shalom ben Boaz

Kohen Tzedek ben Abimai HaKohen (Hebrew: רב כהן צדק בן איבומאי הכהן; c. 816 – 848) was the Gaon of Sura from 832 to 843.

== Biography ==
Kohen Tzedek was born in about 816. His father Rav Abimai was the Sura Gaon in 815 and a descendants of the Exilarchs. He was appointed to the Gaonate in 832, succeeding his great uncle Mesharsheya Kahana ben Jacob. Unlike many of his contemporaries, Kohen Tzedek spoke primarily in Hebrew as opposed to Aramaic. Several of his liturgical rulings are recorded by Isaac ibn Ghiyyat, and two of his responsa have been persevered. The first is in regards to circumcision. Kohen Tzedek reveals a respectful attitude toward local custom even when it diverges from the practice of the Babylonian academies. The other, is in regards to Shacharit (morning prayer). Kohen Tzedek states that when reading the Shema, one should add "אהבה רבה" (lit. great love) and in the Maariv prayer should add "אהבת עולם" (lit. love of the world). Kohen Tzedek died in 848 in Chamchamal and was succeeded by Sar Shalom ben Boaz.

Preceded by Mesharsheya Kahana ben Jacob	Gaon of the Sura Academy; 832–843	Succeeded by Sar Shalom ben Boaz
