= Isaac (Gaon) =

Isaac (Hebrew: יצחק) was head of the Palestinian Gaonate in the 10th century.

== Details ==
According to a fragment found in the Cairo Genizah (T-S 312.82), Isaac reigned as Gaon for two years. Gil estimates his reign to have occurred around 910–912 CE. According to the approach of Abramson and Stern, Isaac was Av Beit Din during the calendar controversy of 921.

Jewish titles
Preceded by Aaron ben Moses ben Meir	Gaon of Palestine; Isaac circa 910–912	Succeeded by Aaron ben Meir
