= Eli ben Yehudah ha-Nazir =

Eli ben Yehudah ha Nazir ben Zechariah (עלי בן יהודה הנזיר), Arabic Abu Kathir Yahya al Katib ("Father of Kathir, Yahya the Scribe", fl. Tiberias, 910s), was a Jewish Tiberian grammarian and philologist of the Hebrew, Arabic and Aramaic languages. He may have been among the teachers in Tiberias of Saadia.

His Arabic language treatise is entitled Usul al-Lugha al-'ibraniyya (c. 915) أصول اللغة العبرانيّة ("Origins of the Hebrew language"). He also commented on the opinion regarding the dagesh pronunciation of the Hebrew letter Resh as articulated by the Mazya community among earlier mesorah masters of Tiberias (c. 775-825).
