= Isaac Broydé =

Russian orientalist and librarian (1867–1922)

Isaac David Broydé (23 February 1867, Grodno Governorate, Russian Empire – 15 April 1922, New York City) was an Orientalist and librarian.

== Life ==
He was born in Porozowo, in the Grodno Governorate of the Russian Empire (present-day Belarus). After attending the gymnasium at Grodno, he went in 1883 to Paris. There he studied at the Sorbonne, receiving his diploma from the École des Langues Orientales in 1892, and from the École des Hautes Études, Section des Sciences Historiques et Philologiques, in 1894. From 1890 to 1895 he was secretary to Joseph Derenbourg, and on the death of the latter, in 1895, was appointed by the publication committee of the Alliance Israélite Universelle one of the collaborators to continue the publication of Saadia's works, which Derenbourg had commenced.

In 1895 Broydé was appointed librarian to the Alliance Israélite Universelle, which position he resigned in 1900. He then went to London, and during his short stay there catalogued the library of Elkan Nathan Adler. The same year he went to New York and joined the editorial staff of the Jewish Encyclopedia. He also worked for the New York Public Library.

== Works ==
Broydé was the author of the following works:

- "Résumé des Réflexions sur l'Ame de Baḥya ben Joseph ibn Pakuda," Paris, 1894
- "Torat ha-Nefesh": "Réflexions sur l'Ame de Baḥya ben Joseph ibn Pakuda," translated from the Arabic into Hebrew, with notes and an introduction, Paris, 1894
- "La Prise de Jérusalem par les Perses, sous Heraclius," Orléans, 1896, translated from an old Arabic manuscript in Count Couret's collection of documents relating to the Crusades.

He also contributed several articles on Jewish subjects to the Jewish Quarterly Review and the Revue des Études Juives.
