= Book of Meat over Coals =

The Book of Meat over Coals (Hebrew: ספר בשר על גבי גחלים, romanized: Sefer basar al gabei gehalim) is a lost halakhic work, first cited in the 11th century. Dozens of quotes from it survive, some in printed books and some still in manuscript.

== Name ==
Some suggest that the name references a passage in the Talmud about bishul yisrael: "If a Jew places meat on coals, and a gentile comes and turns in over, the meat is permitted".

Yaakov ben Moshe Levi Moelin wrote: "The book is called Meat over Coals because its contents have the taste (a pun, Heb. ta'am means both literal "taste" and "good sense") of meat roasted over coals", an approach followed by Chaim Yosef David Azulai.

According to Abraham Berliner, "there can no question that the title is its lost incipit".

== Authorship ==
The identity of the author is unknown. In one manuscript of the Greater (Note: A term used to distinguish these glosses from those of Samuel Schlettstadt, who abridged the Mordechai.) Glosses to the Mordechai, it is attributed to a certain "Rav Bibi Gaon". A similarly-named rabbi, Bibai HaLevi, was gaon in Sura from 777 to 788, but the book cites geonim from after his time. Solomon ibn Adret attributes it to "Samuel haLevi" (perhaps Samuel ibn Naghrillah or Samuel ibn Tibbon), and a 16th-century tradition suggests the author was Rabbeinu Tam (perhaps an error, Chananel ben Chushiel being meant). Eleazar of Worms writes that "so decided Yehudai ben Nahman in the Meat over Coals"; according to Abraham Dziubas, this implies that Yehudai was the author, but Salomon Buber believed the Meat over Coals had merely cited Yehudai.

According to most researchers, the book was written in Babylon, but Avraham Grossman claims it was written in Ashkenaz in the mid-11th century, and that the author may be Yaakov ben Yakar. Grossman cites the following evidence:

- The book is mentioned only by rabbis from Germany and France
- Some of the ideas in the book are ideas written by early sages of Ashkenaz, like Meshullam ben Kalonymos and Meshullam beRabbi Moshe.
- Some of the sources cited in the book don't align the Babylonian school of rabbis.
- Its writing style differs many times from the Babylonian writing style, especially in its use of the first-person singular, while Babylonian rabbis wrote in first-person plural.
