= Johanan ben Baroka =

Johanan ben Baroka (or Johanan b. Baroka; Hebrew: רבי יוחנן בן בְּרוֹקַה, or sometimes spelled יוחנן בן ברוקא, both read as Yochanan ben [son of] Beroka) was a second and third generation Jewish Tanna sage (2nd century).

He was a disciple of Rabbi Yehoshua and colleague of Eleazar Chisma. He maintained a scholarly intercourse with Johanan ben Nuri.

He had a son, R. Ishmael ben Johanan ben Baroka, who was accounted in the fourth generation of the Jewish Tanna sages.

== Teachings ==
A considerable number of halakhot have been handed down in his name. Many of them, particularly those concerning marital and civil affairs, were adopted as law.

He is also cited in the aggadah. According to him, the saying "Be fruitful, and multiply, and replenish the earth," implies that the duty of propagating humanity devolves upon woman as well as upon man. He taught that whoever profanes the name of God, even secretly, is punished publicly, whether the deed is committed intentionally or unintentionally.
