= Zemah ben Hayyim =

Zemah ben Hayyim (Hebrew: צמח בן חיים), or sometimes Zemah b. Hayyim, was Gaon of Sura from roughly 889 to 895. He was the stepbrother of Nahshon ben Zadok, the prior head of the Academy. Nothing is known of Zemah's personal career, beyond his involvement in the Eldad ha-Dani affair of 880.

Zemah believed that Eldad may indeed be of Danite heritage, but did not view such a concession as undermining the legitimacy of the Talmudic tradition:

"Before our forefathers came to the land of Canaan, they were occupied in wars and forgot the Mishnah that they had received from the mouth of Moses; and it was said even of Joshua, of blessed memory, that he had doubts after the death of Moses; and of all the tribes that were in all the land, the tribes of Judah and Benjamin preserved [the knowledge of] the Torah more than all."

This responsum, which appeared in part in the first edition of the Shalshelet ha-Ḳabbalah (Venice, 1480), was republished as completely as possible by A. Epstein in Vienna in his Eldad ha-Dani. It embraces nine points and concludes with an apology for Eldad's forgetfulness. According to Epstein, only one other responsum by Ẓemaḥ has been published; it is given in the Constantinople edition of the Pardes, and ends with the same words as does the first-mentioned responsum: לנטות ימין ושמאל. I.H. Weiss, however, ascribes to this gaon also the authorship of responsa in Sha'arei Tzedek (iv., No. 14) and in the compilation Ḥemdah Genuzah (Nos. 58–61, 111-131).

Preceded by Nahshon ben Zadok	Gaon of the Sura Academy; 879-886	Succeeded by Rav Malka
