= Sar Shalom ben Boaz =

Mar-Rav Sar Shalom bar Boaz
- שר שלום בר בועז

Personal life
- Died: c. 850
- Era: 9th century
- Known for: Gaon of Sura, prolific writer
- Other name: Sar Shalom Gaon

Religious life
- Religion: Judaism

Senior posting
- Based in: Sura, Babylonia
- Predecessor: Kohen Tzedek bar Abimai
- Successor: Natronai bar Hilai

Sar Shalom bar Boaz (Hebrew: מ״ר שר שלום בר מ״ר בועז) also known as Sar Shalom Gaon was the Gaon of Sura from 838 to 848. He was one of the most prolific writers of his time, having more than one hundred responsa attributed to him. (Note: Note that many of the responsa attributed to Sar Shalom in printed collections are not truly his. Teshuvot haGeonim Shaarei Teshuva (Thessaloniki, 1802), the original source for these attributions, is infamous for its habit of attaching geonic names to unrelated excerpts. See Albeck, HaEshkol (1931), "Introduction" pp. 42-48.) He is known for his unusually lenient and tolerant attitude towards Halakha, which defined his tenure as gaon and left an impact on the complexion of Babylonian Jewry.

== Biography ==
Sar Shalom was elected to the Gaonate c. 840, succeeding Kohen Tzedek bar Abimai, and served for ten years until his death. He was succeeded as Gaon of Sura by Natronai bar Hilai.

== Teachings ==
During his time as gaon, Sar Shalom established a close and extensive relationships with other Jewish communities, such as those in Rome, Spain and especially Kairouan to which many of his responsa where addressed. In many of said responsa, he warned the people not to establish halakhic institutions which they would not be able to observe, and if he heard that a community had restricted itself by a vow which it later felt unable to comply with, he would use the authority of his office to rescind it.

In almost all of his responsa to neighbouring communities, Sar Shalom writes in a friendly and non condescending tone despite his esteemed position. In halakhic cases, he often points out the differences between Sura and Pumbedita, letting each community choose which academy's view suits them best. Furthermore, he would go on to explain in great detail his halakhic reasoning, so that each community could learn the processes of psak (halakic decision making).

His responsa also clearly show that Sar Shalom was very tolerant toward non-Jews; he explicitly prohibited taking advantage of, or in any way infringing upon the rights of, gentiles, even when there was no chillul Hashem. Despite his mild and tolerant disposition, he was adamantly against money lenders, and encouraged the severe punishment of those men who treat their wives poorly or those women who are rebellious toward their husbands.

He often interpreted the Bible symbolically. In one particular case, he explained that the thirty cubits length of the upper curtains of the Temple represented the thirty generations from Isaac to Zedekiah, who witnessed the destruction of Solomon's Temple. Similarly, he also states that the Temple menorah consisting of twenty-five parts symbolizes the twenty-five generations from Adam to Moses.

Preceded by Kohen Tzedek ben Abimai	Gaon of the Sura Academy; 843-853	Succeeded by Natronai ben Hilai
