= Zemah ben Paltoi =

Babylonian rabbi (d. 890)

Smah bar Paltoy, also known as Tzemach ben Poltoi and Zemaḥ Gaon (Jewish Babylonian Aramaic: צמח בר מר רב פולטוי, romanized: Ṣmaḥ bar Pullāṭāy, died 890), was the gaon "president" of Pumbedita Academy in Lower Mesopotamia from 872 up until his death in 890. He is an important figure in the history of Rabbinic Judaism.

== Biography ==
Zemah's father, Paltoi ben Abaye, was the Pumbedita Gaon from 841-858, an office which Zemah served himself, after the death of the previous Gaon, Abba ben Ammi. Zemah is most noted for his compilation of the first Talmudic dictionary, the Arukh, a work listing some 300 Aramaic terms, as well as a list of names and places recorded in the Babylonian Talmud. His work became the model on which two later works were based: one compiled under the same name in 1101 CE, by R. Nathan ben Jehiel of Rome, and another, a Judeo-Arabic lexicon, compiled by David ben Abraham al-Fasi nearly one-hundred years earlier, and which work elucidates difficult words in the Hebrew Bible. Zemah ben Paltoi's Arukh was in response to a query addressed to him about obscure Aramaic words found in the Talmud. The entries of his lexicon were arranged in alphabetical order, but the work is no longer extant. Excerpts of the work are quoted by Abraham Zacuto in his Sefer Yuchasin. Some of Zemah ben Paltoi's extant responsa concern a man who died in Kairouan and whose heirs were living in Spain, and another concerning a woman whose Ketubbah (marriage contract) had been lost. Zemah ben Paltoi was an ancestor of Rabbi Hai Gaon, from Hai Gaon's maternal line. He was also the great-grandfather of Sherira Gaon.

Preceded by Abba ben Ammi	Gaon of the Pumbedita Academy; 872-889	Succeeded by Hai ben David
