= Saadia Gaon =

10th-century rabbi

Rabbeinu Saʿadiah Gaon Said bin Yusuf al-Fayyumi רבינו סעדיה גאון
- Born: c. July 892; Fayyum (present-day Egypt)
- Died: May 16, 942; Sura
- Burial place: Safed Old Jewish Cemetery
- Era: Medieval philosophy
- Children: Dosa ben Saadia

Saʿadia ben Yosef Gaon (Note: Arabic: سعيد بن يوسف الفيومي Saʿīd bin Yūsuf al-Fayyūmi; Hebrew: סַעֲדְיָה בֶּן יוֹסֵף אַלְפַיּוּמִי גָּאוֹן Saʿăḏyā ben Yōsēf ʾal-Fayyūmī Gāʾōn; alternative English names: Rabbeinu Saʿadiah Gaon ("our Rabbi [the] Saadia Gaon"), often abbreviated RSG (R^{a}S^{a}G); Saadia b. Joseph; Saadia ben Joseph; Saadia ben Joseph of Faym; or Saadia ben Joseph Al-Fayyumi) or Said bin Yusuf al-Fayyumi (892–942) was a prominent rabbi, gaon, Jewish philosopher, and exegete who was active in the Abbasid Caliphate.

Saadia is the first important rabbinic figure to write extensively in Judeo-Arabic. His extensive writings are one of the foundations of Judeo-Arabic literature. Known for his works on Hebrew linguistics, Halakha, and Jewish philosophy, he was a student of the philosophical school known as "Jewish Kalam". In this capacity, his philosophical work entitled The Book of Beliefs and Opinions represents the first systematic attempt to integrate Jewish theology with components of ancient Greek philosophy. Saadia was also very active in opposition to Karaite Judaism in defense of Rabbinic Judaism.

== Biography ==
=== Early life ===
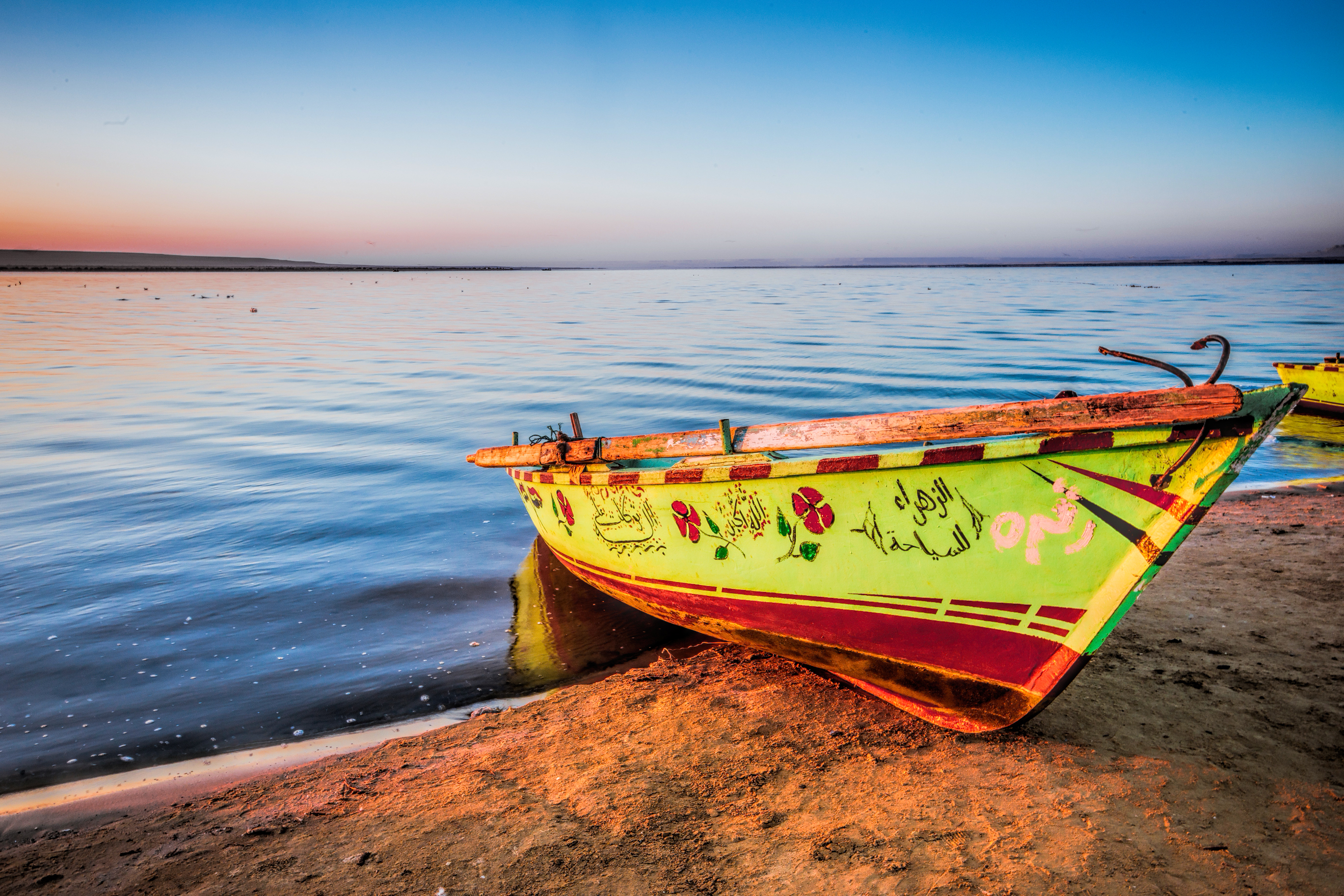
Lake Moeris, called "the Sea" in ancient Egyptian (pꜣ ym), runs East to West and is the defining feature of the Fayyum where Saadia was born and is the origin of its name.

Saadia was born in Dilāẓ in the Faiyum in Middle Egypt in 892. He immigrated to the Land of Israel (in the Abbasid province of Bilad al-Sham) in 915 at the age of 23, where he studied in Tiberias under the scholar Abu Kathir Yaḥya al-Katib (known as Eli ben Yehudah ha-Nazir in Hebrew), a Jewish mutakallim or theologian also mentioned by ibn Ḥazm. In 926, Saadia settled permanently in Lower Mesopotamia, known to Jews as 'Babylonia', where he became a member of Sura Academy.

Saadia, in Sefer ha-Galui, stresses his Jewish lineage, claiming to belong to the noble family of Shelah, son of Judah, and counting among his ancestors Hanina ben Dosa, the famous ascetic of the first century. Saadia expressed this claim by calling his son Dosa; this son later served as gaon of Sura Academy from 1012–1018. Regarding Joseph, Saadia's father, a statement of the Palestinian gaon Aaron ben Meïr has been preserved saying that he was compelled to leave Egypt and died in Jaffa, probably during Saadia's prolonged residence in the Holy Land.

The usual nisba al-Fayyumi refers to Saadia's native place, the Fayyum, which is located in Middle Egypt; in Hebrew, it is often given as Pitomi, derived from a contemporary identification of Fayyum with the Biblical Pithom, an identification found in Saadia's works.

At the age of 20, Saadia began composing his first great work, the Hebrew dictionary called the Agron. At 23, he composed a polemic against the followers of Anan ben David, particularly Solomon ben Yeruham, thus beginning the activity which was to prove important in opposition to Karaite Judaism in defense of Rabbinic Judaism. In the same year, he left Egypt and moved to Palestine. There, he became acquainted with Tiberian Hebrew and studied with Abu Kathir Yahya al-Katib, a Tiberian Jew. His familiarity with Palestinian rabbinic literature distinguished him from earlier Babylonian geonim. He would subsequently introduce the Palestinian Talmud and Palestinian aggadic midrashim into Babylonian rabbinic scholarship, helping establish their use as subsidiary authorities when they did not conflict with the Babylonian Talmud.

In 921, Saadia triumphed over Gaon Aaron ben Meïr over the latter's introduction of a new triennial cycle of Torah reading that also changed the dates of Passover and Rosh Hashanah. Later, one of Saadia's chief disputants was the Karaite by the name of Abu al-Surri ben Zuṭa, who is referred to by Abraham ibn Ezra, in his commentary on Exodus 21:24 and Leviticus 23:15).

In the year 928, at the age of thirty-six (variant: forty-six), David ben Zakkai, the Exilarch or head of Babylonian Jewry, petitioned Saadia to assume the honorary title of gaon, where he was appointed that same year the Gaon of Sura Academy at Mata Mehasya, a position which he held for 14 years until his death.

After only two years of teaching, Saadia recused himself from teaching because of a dispute that had fallen out between him and the Exilarch. During Saadia's absence, his post was occupied by Joseph ben Jacob, the grandson of Natronai ben Hilai. At length, Saadia was reconciled with the Exilarch and returned to serve in his former position, although Joseph ben Jacob also remained serving in his capacity as Gaon.

=== Dispute with Ben Meir ===
In 922, six years before Saadia was appointed Gaon of Babylonia, a controversy arose concerning the Hebrew calendar, which threatened the entire Jewish community. Since Hillel II (around 359 CE), the calendar had been based on a series of rules (described more fully in Maimonides' Code) rather than on observation of the lunar phases. One of these rules required the date of Rosh Hashanah to be postponed if the calculated lunar conjunction occurred at noon or later. Rabbi Aaron ben Meïr, head of the Palestinian Gaonate (then located in Ramla), claimed a tradition according to which the cutoff point was 642/1080 of an hour (approximately 35 minutes) after noon. In that particular year, this change would result in a two-day schism with the major Jewish communities in Babylonia: according to Ben Meir the first day of Passover would be on a Sunday, while according to the generally accepted rule it would be on Tuesday.

Saadia was in Aleppo, on his way from the East, when he learned of Ben Meïr's regulation of the Jewish calendar. Saadia addressed a warning to him, and in Mesopotamia, he placed his knowledge and pen at the disposal of the exilarch David ben Zakkai and the scholars of the academies, adding his letters to those sent by them to the communities of the Jewish diaspora (922). In Babylonia, he wrote his Sefer haMo'adim, or "Book of Festivals", in which he refuted the assertions of Ben Meïr regarding the calendar and helped to avert from the Jewish community the perils of schism.

=== Appointment as Gaon ===
His dispute with Ben Meir was an important factor in his call to Sura in 928. The Exilarch David ben Zakkai insisted on appointing Saadia as Gaon ("head of the academy"). This was done despite the fact that no foreigner had ever served as Gaon before, and against the advice of the aged Nissim Nahrwani, a Resh Kallah at Sura, who feared a confrontation between the two strong-willed personalities, Exilarch David and Saadia. Nissim declared, however, that if David was determined to see Saadia in the position, then he would be ready to become the first of Saadia's followers. Another factor against Saadia's appointment was his relatively undistinguished family, compared to the familial legacies of certain rabbis and their oral traditions.

Under his leadership, the ancient academy of Sura founded by Abba Arikha entered upon a new period of brilliancy. This renaissance was cut short by a clash between Saadia and David, much as Nissim had predicted.

In a probate case, Saadia refused to sign a verdict of the exilarch, which he thought unjust, although the Gaon of Pumbedita had subscribed to it. When the son of the exilarch threatened Saadia with violence to secure his compliance and was roughly handled by Saadia's servant, open war broke out between the exilarch and the gaon. Each excommunicated the other, declaring that he deposed his opponent from office. David ben Zakkai appointed Joseph ben Jacob Gaon of Sura and Saadia conferred the exilarchate on David's brother Hasan (Josiah; 930).

Hasan was forced to flee and died in exile in Greater Khorasan, and the strife that divided Babylonian Judaism continued. Saadia was attacked by the exilarch and his chief adherent, the young but learned Aaron ibn Sargado (later Gaon of Pumbedita, 943–960), in Hebrew pamphlets. Fragments of these pamphlets show a hatred on the part of the exilarch and his partisans that did not shrink from scandal. Saadia did not fail to reply.

=== Influence ===
Saadia's influence upon the Yemenite Jews has been exceptionally great, as many of Saadia's extant works were preserved by the community and used extensively by them. The basis for the Yemenite tiklāl is founded upon the prayer format edited originally by Saadia. The Yemenite Jewish community also adopted thirteen penitential verse written by Saadia for Yom Kippur, as well as the liturgical poems composed by him for Hoshana Rabbah, the seventh day of Sukkot.

Saadia's Judeo-Arabic translation of the Pentateuch, the Tafsir, was copied by the Yemenite Jews in nearly all their handwritten codices. They originally studied Saadia's major work of philosophy, Beliefs and Opinions, in its original Judeo-Arabic, although by the early 20th century, only fragments survived.

=== Method of translation ===
As much as Saadia's Judeo-Arabic translation of the Torah (Tafsīr) has brought relief and succour to Jews living in Arabic-speaking countries, his identification of places, fauna and flora, and the stones of the priestly breastplate, has found him at variance with some scholars. Abraham ibn Ezra, in his commentary on the Torah, wrote scathing remarks about Saadia's commentary, saying: "He doesn't have an oral tradition [...] perhaps he has a vision in a dream, while he has already erred with respect to certain places [...]; therefore, we will not rely on his dreams."

However, Saadia assures his readers elsewhere that when he rendered translations for the twenty-odd unclean fowl mentioned in the Hebrew Bible, (Leviticus 11:13–19; Deuteronomy 14:12–18) his translation was based on an oral tradition received by him. Saadia's method of conveying names for the fowls based on what he had received by way of an oral tradition prompted him to add in his defense: "Every detail about them, had one of them merely come unto us [for identification], we would not have been able to identify it for certain, much less recognize their related kinds."

Scholars now ask whether Saadia applied this principle in his other translations. Re'em (Hebrew: ראם, romanized: rəʾēm), as in Deuteronomy 33:17, improperly translated as "unicorn" in some English translations, is a word that is now used in Modern Hebrew to represent the "oryx". However, Saadia understood the same word to mean "rhinoceros" and writes there the Judeo-Arabic word for the creature (Judeo-Arabic: אלכרכדאן, romanized: al-karkadann). He interprets the zamer (Hebrew: זָֽמֶר, romanized: zāmer) in Deuteronomy 14:5 as giraffe.

Comparative study of Saadia's translations for the Eight Creeping Things of Leviticus, ch. 11
Source Leviticus 11:29–30	Hebrew Word	Saadia Gaon (Judeo-Arabic)	Rashi (Old French)	Septuagint (Greek)
Leviticus 11:29	החֹלד (ha-ḥoled)	אלכׄלד; Middle East blind mole-rat	מושטילא mustele Weasel (Mustela spp.)	γαλἡ (gale); Weasel
Leviticus 11:29	העכבּר (ha-ʿaḫbar)	אלפאר house mouse	xxx	μυς (mys); Mouse
Leviticus 11:29	הצב (ha-ṣav)	אלצׄב; Spiny-tailed lizard (Uromastyx aegyptia)	פוייט froit Toad (Bufo spp.)	κροκόδειλος (krokódeilos); Big lizard
Leviticus 11:30	האנקה (ha-anaqah)	אלורל monitor lizard	הריון heriçon southern white-breasted hedgehog)	μυγάλη (mygáli); Shrew (Crocidura spp.)
Leviticus 11:30	הכח (ha-koaḥ)	אלחרדׄון; Agama lizard (Agama spp.)	xxx	χαμαιλέων (chamailéon); Chameleon
Leviticus 11:30	הלטאה (ha-leṭa’ah)	אלעצׄאיה (Arabic: العظاية, romanized: al-ʿaẓāya); Fringe-toed lizard (Acanthodactylus spp.) (Lacerta spp.)	לישרדה laiserde Lizard (Lacerta spp.)	καλαβώτης (kalavótis); Newt
Leviticus 11:30	החמט (ha-ḥomeṭ)	אלחרבא (Note: Yosef Qafih and Zohar Amar correct the Judeo-Arabic text to read "אלחרבא" (Arabic: حرباء, lit. 'chameleon lizard'. Qafih explains in his commentary on the Responsa and Halachic Decisions of Rabbi Abraham ben David of Posquières, responsum # 91 (note 2), p. 149, that what the inquirer incorrectly mentioned under the Old French name of limace (slug), based on Rashi's translation of חמט in Leviticus 11:30, the original meaning of the word is none other that chameleon lizard.); Chameleon lizard (Chamaeleo spp.)	לימצא limace Slug (Limax spp.)	σαύρα (sávra); Lizard
Leviticus 11:30	התנשמת (ha-tinšameṯ)	אלסמברץ; Mediterranean house gecko	טלפא talpe Mole (Talpa spp.)	ασπάλαξ (aspálax); Mole

In contrast to other medieval commentators, Saadia interpreted the first phrase of Psalms 68:16 as a rhetorical question, so as to say, "Is the hill of God the hill of Bashan? A hunchback mountain is the hill of Bashan!"

Saadia adopts in principle the method of the Chazal that even the episodic-like parts of the Bible (e.g., story of Abraham and Sarah, the selling of Joseph, etc.) that do not contain commandments have a moral lesson to tell.

In some instances, Saadia's biblical translations reflect his own rationale of difficult Hebrew words based on their lexical root, and he will, at times, reject the earlier Targum for his own understanding. For example, in Psalm 16:4, Saadia retracts from the Targum (translated): "They will multiply their goddesses (Hebrew: עַצְּבוֹתָם); they have hastened after some other thing; I shall not pour out their libations of blood, neither shall I take up their names upon my lips", writing instead: "They will multiply their revenues (Judeo-Arabic: אכסאבהם); they have hastened after some other thing", etc. Even where a certain explanation is given in the Talmud, such as the Hebrew words בד בבד in Exodus 30:34 (explained in Taanit 7a as meaning "each spice pounded separately"), Saadia deviates from the rabbinic tradition in his Judeo-Arabic translation of the Pentateuch, in this case explaining its sense as "having them made of equal portions."

In another apparent deviation from Talmudic tradition, where the Talmud (Hullin 63a) names a biblical species of fowl (Leviticus 11:18) known as raḥam (רחם) and says that it is the colorful European bee-eater called the sheraqraq, Saadia in his Judeo-Arabic translation of the Humash writes that raḥam is the Egyptian vulture, based on the phonetic similarity of its Arabic name with the Hebrew. The sheraqraq (Arabic: شقراق, romanized: šiqirrāq) is a bird that harbingers rain in the Levant (around October), for which reason the Talmud says: "When raḥam arrives, mercy (raḥamīm) comes into the world."

=== Later years ===
He wrote both in Hebrew and in Arabic a work, now known only from a few fragments, entitled Sefer ha-Galui (Arabic title, Kitab al-Ṭarid), in which he emphasized with great but justifiable pride the services which he had rendered, especially in his opposition to heresy.

The fourteen years which Saadia spent in Iraq did not interrupt his literary activity. His principal philosophical work was completed in 933; and four years later, through Ibn Sargado's father-in-law, Bishr ben Aaron, the two enemies were reconciled. Saadia was reinstated in his office; but he held it for only five more years. David b. Zakkai died before him (c. 940), being followed a few months later by the exilarch's son Judah, while David's young grandson was nobly protected by Saadia as by a father. According to a statement made by Abraham ibn Daud and doubtless derived from Saadia's son Dosa, Saadia himself died in Iraq at Sura in 942, at the age of sixty, of "black gall" (melancholia), repeated illnesses having undermined his health.

=== Mention in Sefer Hasidim ===
An anecdote is reported in Sefer Hasidim about Saadia ben Yosef "the sage", in which he ends a dispute between a servant who claims to be the heir of his deceased master and the man's true son and heir by having them both draw blood into separate vessels. He then took a bone from the deceased man and placed it into each of the cups. The bone in the cup of the true heir absorbed the blood, while the servant's blood was not absorbed in the bone. Using this as genetic proof of the son's true inheritance, Saadia had the servant return the man's property to his son.

== Significance ==
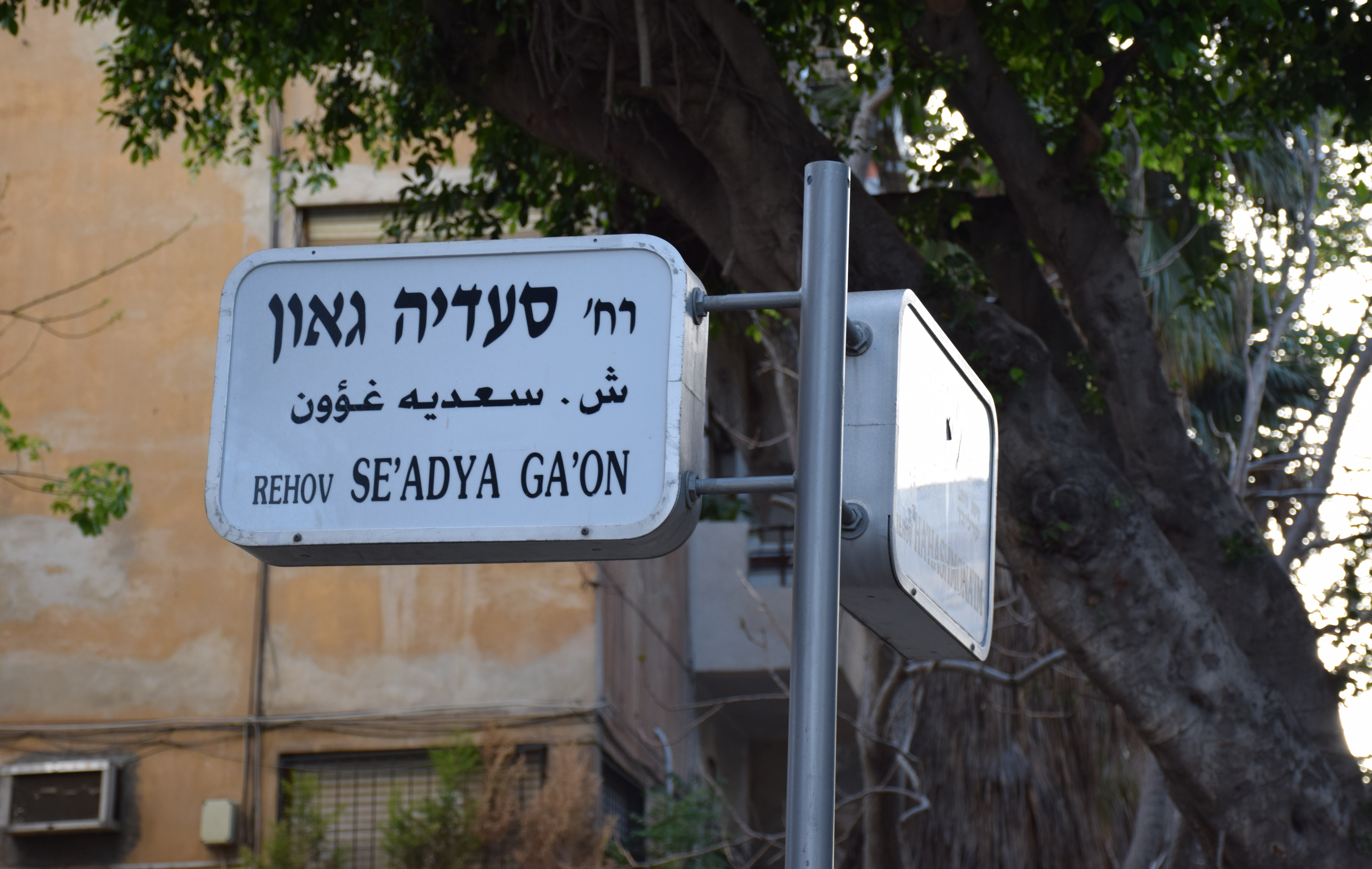
A street sign at the intersection of Se’adya Ga’on and HaHashmona’im streets in Tel Aviv

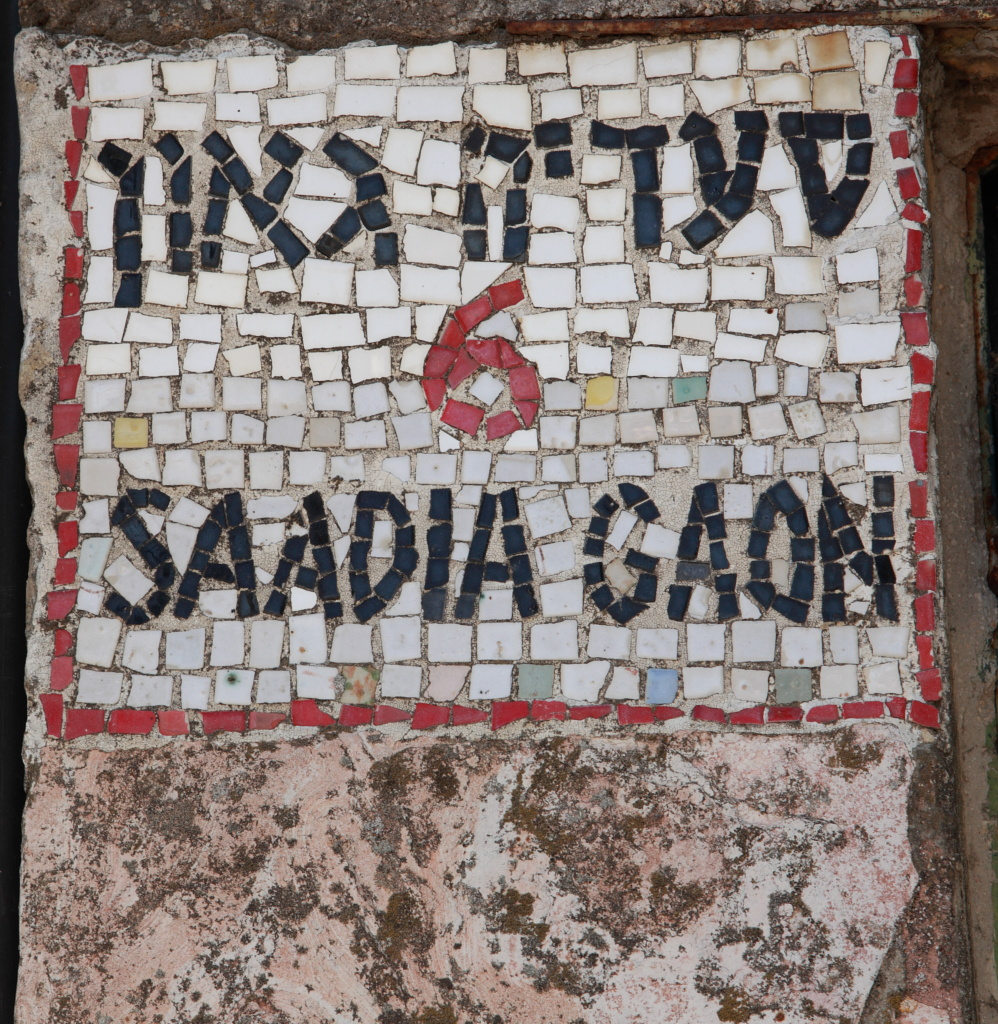
Sign on Saadia Gaon street

Saadia Gaon was a pioneer in the fields in which he toiled. The foremost object of his work was the Bible; his importance is due primarily to his establishment of a new school of Biblical exegesis characterized by a rational investigation of the contents of the Bible and a scientific knowledge of the language of the holy text.

Saadia's Arabic translation of the Torah is of importance for the history of civilization; itself a product of the Arabization of a large portion of Judaism, it served for centuries as a potent factor in the impregnation of the Jewish spirit with Arabic culture, so that, in this respect, it may take its place beside the Greek translation of antiquity and the German translation of the Pentateuch by Moses Mendelssohn. As a means of popular religious enlightenment, Saadia's translation presented the Scriptures even to the unlearned in a rational form which aimed at the greatest possible degree of clarity and consistency.

His system of hermeneutics was not limited to the exegesis of individual passages, but also treated each book of the Bible as a whole, showing the connection of its various portions with one another.

The commentary contained, as is stated in the author's own introduction to his translation of the Pentateuch, not only an exact interpretation of the text, but also a refutation of the cavils which the heretics raised against it. Further, it set forth the bases of the commandments of reason and the characterization of the commandments of revelation; in the case of the former the author appealed to philosophical speculation; of the latter, naturally, to tradition.

The position assigned to Saadia in the oldest list of Hebrew grammarians, which is contained in the introduction to Abraham ibn Ezra's "Moznayim", has not been challenged even by the latest historical investigations. Here, too, he was the first; his grammatical work, now lost, gave an inspiration to further studies, which attained their most brilliant and lasting results in Spain, and he created in part the categories and rules along whose lines was developed the grammatical study of the Hebrew language. His dictionary, primitive and merely practical as it was, became the foundation of Hebrew lexicography; and the name "Agron" (literally, "collection"), which he chose and doubtless created, was long used as a designation for Hebrew lexicons, especially by the Karaites. The very categories of rhetoric, as they were found among the Arabs, were first applied by Saadia to the style of the Bible. He was likewise one of the founders of comparative philology, not only through his brief "Book of Seventy Words", already mentioned, but especially through his explanation of the Hebrew vocabulary by the Arabic, particularly in the case of the favorite translation of Biblical words by Arabic terms having the same sound.

Saadia's works were the inspiration and basis for later Jewish writers, such as Berachyah in his encyclopedic philosophical work Sefer Hahibbur (The Book of Compilation).

Saadia likewise identifies the definitive trait of "a cock girded about the loins" within Proverbs 30:31 (Douay–Rheims Bible) as "the honesty of their behavior and their success", rather than the aesthetic interpretations of so many others, thus identifying a spiritual purpose of a religious vessel within that religious and spiritual instilling schema of purpose and use.

In his commentary on Kohelet, Saadia says that Solomon mastered mathematics, philosophy, engineering, science, music, medicine and astronomy.

== Relations to mysticism ==
In his commentary on the Sefer Yetzirah, Saadia sought to render lucid and intelligible the content of this esoteric work by the light of philosophy and scientific knowledge, especially by a system of Hebrew phonology that he himself had founded. He did not permit himself in this commentary to be influenced by the theological speculations of the Kalam, which are so important in his main works.

In introducing Sefer Yetzirah's theory of creation, he makes a distinction between the Genesis creation narrative of creatio ex nihilo, in which no process of creation is described, and the process described in the Sefer Yetzirah: matter formed by speech. The cosmogony of the Sefer Yetzirah is even omitted from the discussion of creation in his magnum opus, The Book of Beliefs and Opinions.

Concerning the supposed attribution of the book to the Biblical patriarch Abraham, he allows that the ideas it contains might be ancient. Nonetheless, he clearly considered the work worthy of deep study and echoes of Sefer Yetzirah's cosmogony do appear in The Book of Beliefs and Opinions when Saadia discusses his theory of prophecy in Judaism.

== Works ==
=== Exegesis ===
Saadia translated the Humash and some of the other books of the Hebrew Bible into Judeo-Arabic, adding a Judeo-Arabic commentary.

- Torah
- Isaiah
- Megillot
- Tehillim (Judeo-Arabic translation and commentary, which he called Kitāb al-tasbiḥ [= "the Book of Praise"])
- Iyyov (Book of Job) (translated to English by Dr. Goodman), and Mishlei
- Daniel

Saadia translated Megillat Antiochus into Judeo-Arabic and wrote an introduction.

=== Hebrew linguistics ===
1. Agron
2. Kutub al-Lughah, also known as Kitāb faṣīḥ lughat al-‘ibrāniyyīn, "The Book of Eloquent Language of the Hebrews"
3. "Tafsir al-Sab'ina Lafẓah", a list of seventy (properly ninety) Hebrew (and Aramaic) words which occur in the Hebrew Bible only once or very rarely, and which may be explained from traditional literature, especially from the Neo-Hebraisms of the Mishnah. This small work has been frequently reprinted.

=== Halakhic writings ===
1. Short monographs in which problems of Jewish law are systematically presented. Of these Arabic treatises, little but the titles and extracts is known, and it is only in the "Kitab al-Mawarith" that fragments of any length have survived.
2. A commentary on the thirteen rules of Rabbi Ishmael, preserved only in a Hebrew translation by Nahum Ma'arabi. An Arabic methodology of the Talmud is also mentioned, by Chaim Yosef David Azulai, as a work of Saadia under the title Kelale ha-Talmud.
3. Responsa. With few exceptions these exist only in Hebrew, some of them having been probably written in that language.
4. The Siddur of Saadia Gaon (Kitāb jāmiʿ al-ṣalawāt wal-tasābīḥ), containing the texts of the prayers, commentary in Arabic and original synagogal poetry. Of this synagogal poetry the most noteworthy portions are the "Azharot" on the 613 commandments, which give the author's name as "Sa'id b. Joseph", followed by the title "Alluf", thus showing that the poems were written before he became gaon.

=== Philosophy of religion ===
1. The Book of Beliefs and Opinions (Kitāb al-amānāt wal-iʿtiqādāt): This work, first compiled in 933, of which several revisions were made until its final redaction, is considered to be the first systematic attempt to synthesize the Jewish tradition with philosophical teachings.

Prior to Saadia, the only other Jew to attempt any such fusion was Philo (Ivry 1989). Saadia's objective here was to show the parallelism between the truths delivered to the people of Israel by divine revelation, on the one side, and the necessary conclusions that can also be reached by way of rational observation, on the other. The effect of these ideas expressed in his philosophical books are clearly reflected in Saadia's story of creation, especially when he comes to deal with the theological problems, such as in the verse of Deuteronomy 4:24: "For the LORD your God is a devouring fire," which constitutes an example of a verse that cannot be understood in its plain context, but should rather be understood in such a way as not to contradict one's definite knowledge that God does not change, nor can anything corporeal be associated with him.

1. Tafsīr Kitāb al-Mabādī, an Arabic translation of and commentary on the Sefer Yetzirah, written while its author was still residing in Egypt (or Israel), and intended to explain in a scientific manner how the universe came into existence. On the linguistic aspect, Saadia combines a debate on the letters and on their attributes (e.g. phonemes), as well as a debate on related linguistic matters.

=== Polemical writings ===
1. Refutations of Karaite authors, always designated by the name "Kitab al-Radd", or "Book of Refutation". These three works are known only from scanty references to them in other works; that the third was written after 933 is proved by one of the citations.
2. "Kitab al-Tamyiz" (in Hebrew, "Sefer ha-Hakkarah"), or "Book of Distinction", composed in 926, and Saadia's most extensive polemical work. It was still cited in the twelfth century; and a number of passages from it are given in a Biblical commentary of Japheth ha-Levi.
3. There was perhaps a special polemic of Saadia against Ben Zuta, though the data regarding this controversy between is known only from the gaon's gloss on the Torah.
4. A refutation directed against the rationalistic Biblical critic Hiwi al-Balkhi, whose views were rejected by the Karaites themselves;
5. "Kitab al-Shara'i'", or "Book of the Commandments of Religion".
6. "Kitab al-'Ibbur", or "Book of the Calendar", likewise apparently containing polemics against Karaite Jews;
7. "Sefer ha-Mo'adim", or "Book of Festivals", the Hebrew polemic against Ben Meir which has been mentioned above.
8. "Sefer ha-Galui", also composed in Hebrew and in the same flowery biblical style as the "Sefer ha-Mo'adim", being an autobiographical and apologetic work directed against the Exilarch (rosh galuth), David b. Zakkai, and his chief patron, Aharon ibn Sargado, in which he proved his own uprightness and equity in the matter of controversy between them.

== See also ==
- Rabbi Yosef Qafih: Saadia Gaon (Hebrew translations of several Saadia Gaon's works)
- Jewish philosophy

== Notes ==
Preceded by Yom-Tob Kahana ben R. Jacob	Gaon of the Sura Academy; 928-942	Succeeded by Joseph ben Jacob
