= Natronai ben Hilai =

9th century rabbi

Natronai ben Hilai (Hebrew: נטרונאי בן הלאי or Natronai the Gaon, Hebrew: נטרונאי הגאון; Full name: Natronai ben Hilai ben Mari) was Gaon "head rabbi" of the Sura Academy of Rabbinic Judaism in Lower Mesopotamia from 857 until 865. He held this post for ten years. He is responsible for more written responsa to queries posed to him by world Jewry than any of his predecessors, and maintained close contact with the Jews of al-Andalus (now Spain and Portugal).

== Responsa ==
Naṭronai was elderly when he became Gaon. Nonetheless, he issued many responsa. Questions were addressed to him from all parts of the Jewish diaspora. His answers, about 300 of which have been preserved in various compilations (e.g., in Shaʿare Ṣedeq, Teshuvot ha-Ge'onim, and Qebbuṣat ha-Ḥakamim, Teshuvot Rav Natrunai Gaon, Jerusalem 5771, edited by Y. Brody), show his thorough mastery of the subjects treated as well as his ability to impart knowledge.

Natronia always employed the language with which his correspondents were most conversant. He wrote equally well in Jewish Babylonian Aramaic and Medieval Hebrew. He was the first attested Gaon to use Arabic (in the form of Classical Judeo-Arabic) for scholastic correspondence.

== Opposition to Karaites ==
Natronai staunchly opposed Karaite Judaism. He endeavored to enforce the observance of every rabbinic provision emanating from or as explained by either of the Talmudic academies in Babylonia. Since the Karaites rejected the ritualistic forms of these schools, he made strenuous efforts to establish uniformity among the Rabbanites. The origin of many ritualistic formulae is traced to him.

Naṭronai was also credited with a mastery of kefitzat haderech (qəfiṣáth haddérekh "shortening of the way"), or magical transit. He allegedly miraculously transported himself to France, where he instructed the people, and then returned to Mesopotamia the same way. Hai ben Sherira, however, denied this, suggesting that some adventurer may have impersonated Natronai and imposed on the Jews of France.

Preceded by Sar Shalom ben Boaz	Gaon of the Sura Academy; 853-861	Succeeded by Amram Gaon
