= Sura Academy =

Jewish yeshiva in Sura, Babylonia

Sura סורא
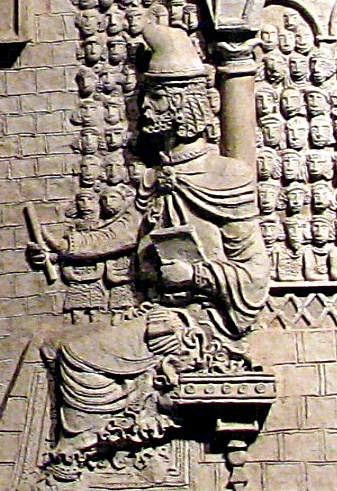
- An exhibit depicting Rav Ashi teaching at the Sura Academy

- Location within Iraq
- Coordinates: 31°52′00″N 44°27′00″E
- Country: Iraq

Sura Academy (Hebrew: ישיבת סורא) was a Jewish yeshiva located in Sura in what is now southern Iraq, a region known in Jewish texts as "Babylonia". With Pumbedita Academy, it was one of the two major Jewish academies from the year 225 CE at the beginning of the era of the Amora sages until 1033 CE at the end of the era of the Gaonim. Sura Academy was founded by the Amora Abba Arikha ("Rav"), a disciple of Judah ha-Nasi. Among the well-known sages that headed the yeshiva were Rav Huna, Rav Chisda, Rav Ashi, Yehudai ben Nahman, Natronai ben Hilai, Saadia Gaon, and others.

== History ==
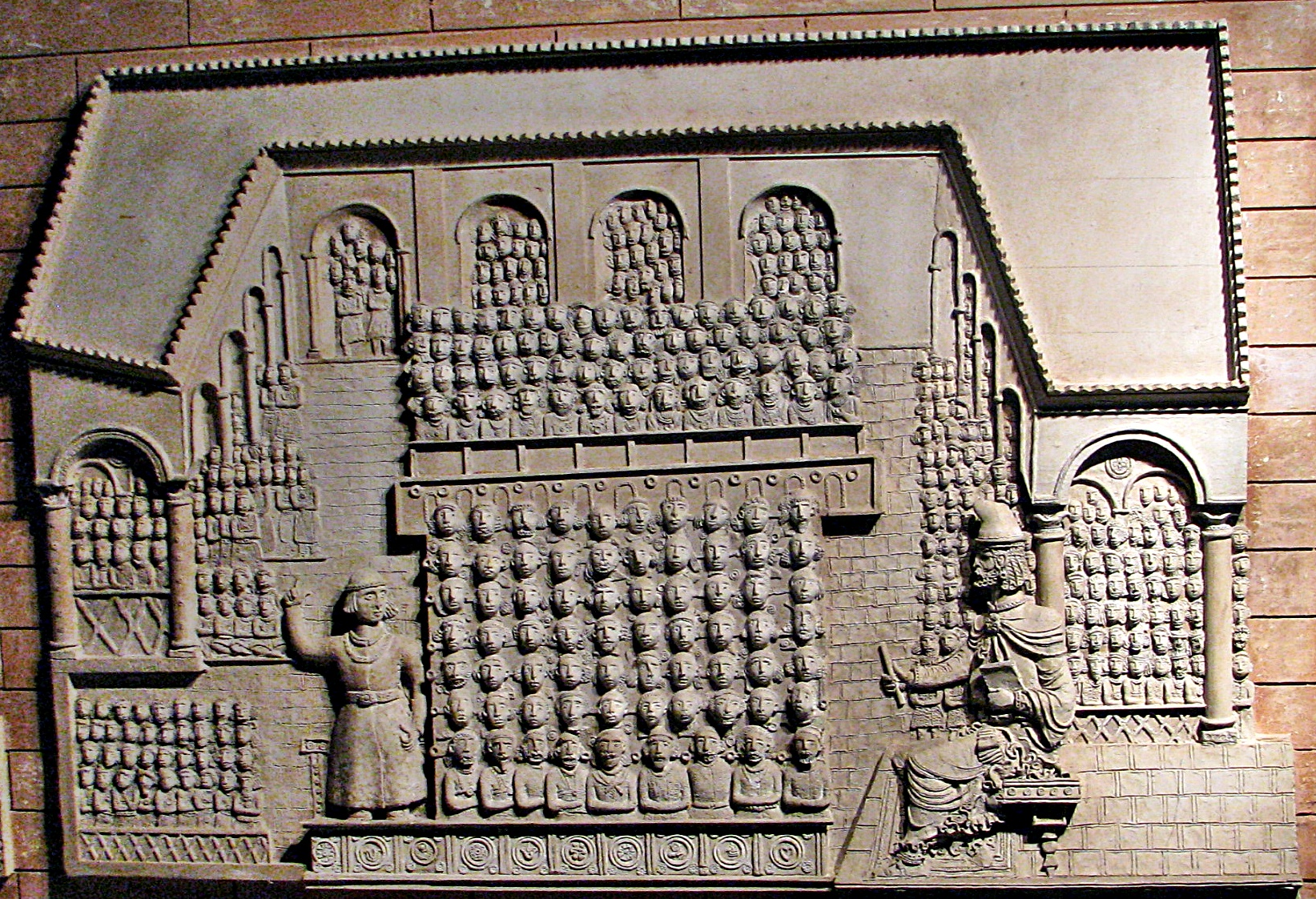
A depiction of Rabbi Ashi teaching at the Sura Academy

Abba Arikha arrived at Sura city to find no lively Jewish religious public life, and since he was worried about the continuity of the Jewish community in Babylonia, he left his colleague Samuel of Nehardea and began working to establish the yeshiva that would become Sura Academy. Upon Abba Arikha's arrival, teachers from surrounding cities and towns descended upon Sura. The Academy was formally founded in 225 CE, several years after Arikha's arrival.

Sura Academy would eventually grow to include a faculty of 1,200 members and included the following features:

- ˀekhseḏrā (Jewish Babylonian Aramaic: אכסדרא, from Koine Greek: ἐξέδρα), a covered walkway leading from the street up to the house of learning
- qṭon (קיטון), offices for the rabbis and deans and classrooms for teachers
- gannǝṯā (גינתא), garden whose produce fed the academy's teachers and students
- ṣeppē (ציפי), flat mats placed on the floor where teachers and students could rest between classes

Sura Academy soon became the most influential yeshiva in its region, besting the Nehardea Academy.

The academy's classes were occasionally held at Matha-Mehasia (מתא מחסיא), a suburb of Sura city, and after a while a Torah center was founded there as well.

== List of Sura academy's Deans ==
=== Amora era ===
- Abba Arikha ("Rav") (founder of the academy)
- Rav Huna (Rosh yeshiva, after Rav, for about 40 years)
- Rav Chisda
- Rav Ashi
- Maremar
- Idi b. Abin Naggara
- Nachman bar Huna
- Mar bar Rav Ashi (Tabyomi)
- Rabbah Tosafa'ah
- Ravina II

=== Savora era ===
- Rav Ena

=== Gaonim era ===
- Mar ben R. Huna – 591
- R. Hanina (Hananiah, Hinenai) – around 610
- Rav Hunai (Huna) – around 650
- Rav Sheshna (Sheshua, Mesharsheya b. Tahlifa) – around 670
- Hanina of Nehar Pekkod (Hananiah, Hinenai, Ha-Kohen, of Nhr [River] Paqod) – 689-694
- Hillai of Naresh (Nehilai, Ha-Levi) – 694–712
- Jacob of Nehar Pekod (Ha-Kohen, Nhr Paqod) – 712–730
- Rav Samuel Gaon (of Pumbedita) (Rabba's grandson, descendant of Amemar) – 730–748
- Mari ha-Kohen of Nehar Pekod (Nahr Paqod) – 748–756
- Rav Aha Gaon – 756
- Yehudai ben Nahman (Yehudai Gaon, Judah) (Author of Halakhot Pessoukot) – 757–761
- Ahhunai Kahana ben Papa (Ahunai, Huna, ha-Kohen) – 761–769
- Haninai Kahana ben R. Huna (Hanina, ha-Kohen, Ahunai) – 769–774
- Mari ha-Levi ben R. Mesharsheya – 774–778
- Bebai ha-Levi ben R. Abba of Nehar Pekod (Biboi, Nahr Paqod) – 778–789
- Hilai ben R. Mari (Hillai) – 789–798
- Jacob ha-Kohen ben Mordecai (Mordechai) – 798
- Rav Abimai (Abumai, Ikhomai, ha-Kohen) (brother of R. Mordecai) – 815
- Zadok ben R. Ashi (Issac Sadoq, ben Jesse) – 810–812
- Hilai ben R. Hananiah (Hillai) – 812–816
- Kimoi ben R. Ashi (Qimoi) – 816–820
- Mesharsheya Kahana ben Jacob Gaon (Moses, ha-Kohen) – 820–830
- Two years of an absence of a Gaon (843–844)
- Kohen Tzedek ben Abimai Gaon (Sedeq, Ikhomai, Abumai) – 832–843
- Sar Shalom ben Boaz – 843–853
- Natronai ben R. Hilai ben R. Mari Gaon (Natronai ben Hilai) – 853–861
- Amram bar Sheshna (Amram Gaon, Amram ben R. Sheshna) (Author of the Siddur) – 861–872
- Nahshon ben R. Zadok – 872–879
- Zemah ben R. Hayyim – (Semah) 879–886
- Rav Malka – 886
- Hai ben R. Nahshon ben Tzadok (ben Issac Sadoq) – 886–896
- Hilai ben Natronai ben Hilai Gaon (Hillai, Natrunai) – 896–904
- Shalom ben R. Mishael – 904
- Jacob ben R. Natronai (ha-Kohen, Natrunai) – 911–924
- Yom-Tob Kahana ben R. Jacob (Yom Tov, ha-Kohen) – 924
- Saadia ben Joseph of Faym (Al-Fayyumi, Saadia Gaon) – 928–942
- Joseph ben Jacob bar Satya (ben Satya) – around 930
- The academy was closed for about 45 years
- Zemah Tzedek ben Paltoi ben Isaac (Semah, Sedeq) – around 990 and around 998
- Samuel ben Hofni (Hophni, ha-Kohen) (father-in-law of Hai Gaon) – around 998 and around 1012
- Dosa ben Saadia Gaon (Son of Saadia Gaon) – 1012–1018
- Israel ha-Kohen ben Samuel ben Hofni (Hophni) – 1018–1033

== See also ==
- History of the Jews in Iraq
- Talmudic Academies in Babylonia
  - Feroz Shapur, (Hellenized as Pirisapora or Bersabora, now known as Anbar), a town adjacent or identical to Nehardea; academy of Pumbedita was moved to this town for half of the 6th century
  - Mahuza, now al-Mada'in; the academy of Pumbedita was relocated to Mahuza during the time of Rava Amora
  - Nehardea Academy (in Nehardea)
  - Pumbedita Academy (in Pumbedita for most of its history, near modern-day Fallujah)
  - Pum-Nahara Academy
  - Sura (city) – the political centre of Jewish Babylonia after Nehardea
- Talmudic Academies in Syria Palaestina (in the Land of Israel)
