= Gaon (Hebrew) =

Hebrew word and title

Gaon (Hebrew: גאון, gā'ōn, lit. 'pride', plural geonim, גְּאוֹנִים, gĕ'ōnīm) was originally a formal title for the Geonim, heads of Talmudic academies in the 6th–11th century. Since the rishonic period, many great rabbis, whether or not they head academies, are often lauded with this honorific as a mark of respect; for example, one may refer to Ovadia Yosef as "HaGaon Ovadia Yosef". Modern Hebrew reuses the word as an equivalent for "genius" based on phonetic similarity.

== Etymology ==
It may have originated as a shortened version of "Rosh Yeshivat Ge'on Ya'akov", although there are alternative explanations. In Ancient Hebrew, it referred to arrogance and haughty pride (Amos 6:8 – "I abhor the pride of Jacob and detest his fortresses; I will deliver up the city and everything in it.") and, according to another explanation, it later became known as a general term for pride, and the title was used as "Pride [of]".

== Examples ==
Prominent Geonim include:

- Yehudai ben Nahman (Gaon 757–761)
- Sar Shalom ben Boaz (Gaon 838–848)
- Natronai ben Hilai, Gaon of Sura (Gaon to 857)
- Amram ben Sheshna, Gaon of Sura (Gaon 857–875)
- Saadia Gaon (882/892 – 942)
- Zemah ben Hayyim (Gaon 889–895)
- Sherira ben Hanina (906–1006)
- Samuel ben Hofni (died 1034)
- Hai ben Sherira (939–1038)

A honorific title given to a few leading rabbis of other countries in the same period, such as:

- Ahai of Shabha (?-753-?)
- Nissim ben Jacob (990–1062)

Specific rabbis of later periods, called "gaon", include:

- The Vilna Gaon (1720–1797)
- Joseph Rosen, the Rogachover Gaon (1858–1936)
- Yaakov Yisrael Kanievsky, the Steipler Gaon (1899–1985)

== See also ==
- Genius (disambiguation)
